This is a partial list of unnumbered minor planets for principal provisional designations assigned between 1 April and 31 July 2001. , a total of 489 bodies remain unnumbered for this period. Objects for this year are listed on the following pages: A–E · Fi · Fii · G–O · P–R · S · T · U · V–W and X–Y. Also see previous and next year.

G 

|- id="2001 GL2" bgcolor=#FFC2E0
| 8 ||  || APO || 20.6 || data-sort-value="0.27" | 270 m || single || 13 days || 16 Apr 2001 || 18 || align=left | Disc.: LONEOSPotentially hazardous object || 
|- id="2001 GM2" bgcolor=#FFC2E0
| 2 ||  || APO || 19.9 || data-sort-value="0.37" | 370 m || multiple || 2001–2014 || 18 May 2014 || 136 || align=left | Disc.: LINEAR || 
|- id="2001 GO2" bgcolor=#FFC2E0
| 7 ||  || APO || 24.3 || data-sort-value="0.049" | 49 m || single || 5 days || 17 Apr 2001 || 23 || align=left | Disc.: LINEAR || 
|- id="2001 GP2" bgcolor=#FFC2E0
| 2 ||  || APO || 26.4 || data-sort-value="0.019" | 19 m || multiple || 2001–2020 || 16 Nov 2020 || 58 || align=left | Disc.: SpacewatchAlt.: 2020 UJ7 || 
|- id="2001 GR2" bgcolor=#FFC2E0
| 1 ||  || APO || 21.6 || data-sort-value="0.17" | 170 m || multiple || 2001–2011 || 20 Oct 2011 || 77 || align=left | Disc.: LINEARPotentially hazardous object || 
|- id="2001 GS2" bgcolor=#FFC2E0
| 1 ||  || AMO || 20.5 || data-sort-value="0.28" | 280 m || multiple || 2001–2020 || 17 May 2020 || 280 || align=left | Disc.: AMOS || 
|- id="2001 GT2" bgcolor=#FFC2E0
| 0 ||  || APO || 19.8 || data-sort-value="0.39" | 390 m || multiple || 2001–2012 || 13 May 2012 || 80 || align=left | Disc.: LONEOSPotentially hazardous object || 
|- id="2001 GQ5" bgcolor=#FA8072
| 0 ||  || MCA || 17.34 || 1.0 km || multiple || 2001–2021 || 27 Oct 2021 || 252 || align=left | Disc.: LINEAR || 
|- id="2001 GX11" bgcolor=#fefefe
| 0 ||  || MBA-I || 17.64 || data-sort-value="0.88" | 880 m || multiple || 2001–2021 || 10 Sep 2021 || 119 || align=left | Disc.: SpacewatchAlt.: 2005 HB13 || 
|- id="2001 GY11" bgcolor=#fefefe
| 1 ||  || HUN || 18.8 || data-sort-value="0.52" | 520 m || multiple || 2001–2020 || 15 Jun 2020 || 38 || align=left | Disc.: Spacewatch || 
|- id="2001 GZ11" bgcolor=#d6d6d6
| 2 ||  || MBA-O || 17.5 || 1.8 km || multiple || 2001–2017 || 24 Mar 2017 || 22 || align=left | Disc.: Spacewatch || 
|- id="2001 GA12" bgcolor=#fefefe
| 0 ||  || MBA-I || 18.27 || data-sort-value="0.66" | 660 m || multiple || 2001–2021 || 15 Apr 2021 || 91 || align=left | Disc.: Spacewatch || 
|- id="2001 GB12" bgcolor=#fefefe
| 0 ||  || MBA-I || 18.70 || data-sort-value="0.54" | 540 m || multiple || 2001–2022 || 26 Jan 2022 || 50 || align=left | Disc.: Spacewatch || 
|- id="2001 GC12" bgcolor=#fefefe
| 0 ||  || MBA-I || 18.4 || data-sort-value="0.62" | 620 m || multiple || 2001–2020 || 13 Sep 2020 || 47 || align=left | Disc.: Spacewatch || 
|- id="2001 GD12" bgcolor=#E9E9E9
| 0 ||  || MBA-M || 18.19 || data-sort-value="0.97" | 970 m || multiple || 2001–2022 || 26 Jan 2022 || 37 || align=left | Disc.: Spacewatch || 
|}
back to top

H 

|- id="2001 HC4" bgcolor=#FA8072
| 0 ||  || MCA || 18.40 || data-sort-value="0.62" | 620 m || multiple || 2001–2019 || 24 Aug 2019 || 118 || align=left | Disc.: AMOS || 
|- id="2001 HW7" bgcolor=#FFC2E0
| 1 ||  || AMO || 20.3 || data-sort-value="0.31" | 310 m || multiple || 2001–2017 || 11 Oct 2017 || 75 || align=left | Disc.: Spacewatch || 
|- id="2001 HX7" bgcolor=#FFC2E0
| 3 ||  || AMO || 20.6 || data-sort-value="0.27" | 270 m || multiple || 2001–2018 || 09 May 2018 || 61 || align=left | Disc.: LINEAR || 
|- id="2001 HH8" bgcolor=#d6d6d6
| 0 ||  || MBA-O || 16.33 || 3.0 km || multiple || 2001–2022 || 27 Jan 2022 || 185 || align=left | Disc.: SpacewatchAlt.: 2004 TG233 || 
|- id="2001 HV15" bgcolor=#FA8072
| – ||  || MCA || 18.5 || 1.1 km || single || 53 days || 15 May 2001 || 28 || align=left | Disc.: AMOS || 
|- id="2001 HU16" bgcolor=#FA8072
| 1 ||  || MCA || 19.39 || data-sort-value="0.34" | 400 m || multiple || 2001-2022 || 25 Jul 2022 || 38 || align=left | Disc.: LONEOS || 
|- id="2001 HB17" bgcolor=#E9E9E9
| 0 ||  || MBA-M || 18.2 || data-sort-value="0.96" | 960 m || multiple || 2001–2020 || 16 Sep 2020 || 41 || align=left | Disc.: SpacewatchAlt.: 2005 CB10 || 
|- id="2001 HD17" bgcolor=#fefefe
| 0 ||  || MBA-I || 18.45 || data-sort-value="0.61" | 610 m || multiple || 2001–2021 || 07 Nov 2021 || 64 || align=left | Disc.: SpacewatchAlt.: 2014 WL191 || 
|- id="2001 HR17" bgcolor=#E9E9E9
| 2 ||  || MBA-M || 18.05 || data-sort-value="0.57" | 750 m || multiple || 2001-2022 || 23 May 2022 || 25 || align=left | Disc.: Spacewatch || 
|- id="2001 HC19" bgcolor=#fefefe
| 0 ||  || MBA-I || 18.1 || data-sort-value="0.71" | 710 m || multiple || 2001–2020 || 28 Jun 2020 || 43 || align=left | Disc.: LPL/Spacewatch II || 
|- id="2001 HU19" bgcolor=#d6d6d6
| – ||  || MBA-O || 17.8 || 1.5 km || single || 4 days || 28 Apr 2001 || 9 || align=left | Disc.: LPL/Spacewatch II || 
|- id="2001 HH23" bgcolor=#fefefe
| 1 ||  || HUN || 19.21 || data-sort-value="0.43" | 430 m || multiple || 2001–2021 || 09 Apr 2021 || 32 || align=left | Disc.: SpacewatchAlt.: 2016 GL221 || 
|- id="2001 HD24" bgcolor=#d6d6d6
| E ||  || MBA-O || 17.9 || 1.5 km || single || 4 days || 30 Apr 2001 || 9 || align=left | Disc.: Spacewatch || 
|- id="2001 HT24" bgcolor=#FA8072
| 2 ||  || HUN || 19.2 || data-sort-value="0.43" | 430 m || multiple || 2001–2020 || 22 Feb 2020 || 44 || align=left | Disc.: SpacewatchAlt.: 2013 UG4 || 
|- id="2001 HT25" bgcolor=#fefefe
| 0 ||  || MBA-I || 18.6 || data-sort-value="0.57" | 570 m || multiple || 2001–2019 || 20 Oct 2019 || 47 || align=left | Disc.: Spacewatch || 
|- id="2001 HJ30" bgcolor=#d6d6d6
| 1 ||  || MBA-O || 17.2 || 2.0 km || multiple || 2001–2017 || 16 Jul 2017 || 152 || align=left | Disc.: LONEOS || 
|- id="2001 HL30" bgcolor=#FA8072
| 0 ||  || MCA || 17.05 || 1.6 km || multiple || 2001–2022 || 10 Jan 2022 || 97 || align=left | Disc.: AMOS || 
|- id="2001 HO30" bgcolor=#d6d6d6
| 0 ||  || MBA-O || 16.37 || 3.0 km || multiple || 2001–2021 || 04 Oct 2021 || 58 || align=left | Disc.: SpacewatchAdded on 19 October 2020Alt.: 2010 OE96 || 
|- id="2001 HJ31" bgcolor=#FFC2E0
| 7 ||  || APO || 23.8 || data-sort-value="0.062" | 62 m || single || 4 days || 30 Apr 2001 || 25 || align=left | Disc.: LONEOS || 
|- id="2001 HK31" bgcolor=#FFC2E0
| 2 ||  || AMO || 21.0 || data-sort-value="0.22" | 220 m || single || 59 days || 19 Jun 2001 || 85 || align=left | Disc.: LONEOS || 
|- id="2001 HL31" bgcolor=#FFC2E0
| 8 ||  || APO || 20.3 || data-sort-value="0.31" | 310 m || single || 9 days || 08 May 2001 || 72 || align=left | Disc.: LINEAR || 
|- id="2001 HW38" bgcolor=#fefefe
| 0 ||  || MBA-I || 18.7 || data-sort-value="0.54" | 540 m || multiple || 2001–2020 || 22 Jun 2020 || 63 || align=left | Disc.: SpacewatchAlt.: 2016 EM142 || 
|- id="2001 HZ58" bgcolor=#C2E0FF
| 2 ||  || TNO || 6.6 || 159 km || multiple || 2001–2018 || 19 May 2018 || 62 || align=left | Disc.: La Silla Obs.LoUTNOs, cubewano (cold), BR-mag: 1.64; taxonomy: U || 
|- id="2001 HA59" bgcolor=#C2E0FF
| 3 ||  || TNO || 6.5 || 167 km || multiple || 2001–2016 || 29 May 2016 || 13 || align=left | Disc.: La Silla Obs.LoUTNOs, cubewano (cold) || 
|- id="2001 HV67" bgcolor=#fefefe
| 0 ||  || MBA-I || 18.5 || data-sort-value="0.59" | 590 m || multiple || 1998–2020 || 25 May 2020 || 52 || align=left | Disc.: Astrovirtel || 
|- id="2001 HA68" bgcolor=#d6d6d6
| 0 ||  || MBA-O || 16.49 || 2.8 km || multiple || 2001–2022 || 25 Jan 2022 || 135 || align=left | Disc.: SpacewatchAlt.: 2006 DU129 || 
|- id="2001 HQ68" bgcolor=#fefefe
| 0 ||  || MBA-I || 18.6 || data-sort-value="0.57" | 570 m || multiple || 2001–2019 || 03 Oct 2019 || 63 || align=left | Disc.: Spacewatch || 
|- id="2001 HX68" bgcolor=#E9E9E9
| 0 ||  || MBA-M || 17.6 || 1.3 km || multiple || 2001–2020 || 18 Aug 2020 || 83 || align=left | Disc.: Spacewatch || 
|- id="2001 HZ68" bgcolor=#E9E9E9
| 0 ||  || MBA-M || 17.36 || 1.9 km || multiple || 2001–2021 || 02 Dec 2021 || 125 || align=left | Disc.: SDSSAlt.: 2010 NQ95 || 
|- id="2001 HA69" bgcolor=#d6d6d6
| 0 ||  || MBA-O || 16.7 || 2.5 km || multiple || 2001–2019 || 27 Oct 2019 || 78 || align=left | Disc.: Spacewatch || 
|- id="2001 HD69" bgcolor=#E9E9E9
| 0 ||  || MBA-M || 16.7 || 1.9 km || multiple || 2001–2021 || 06 Jan 2021 || 85 || align=left | Disc.: LONEOS || 
|- id="2001 HE69" bgcolor=#fefefe
| 0 ||  || MBA-I || 17.9 || data-sort-value="0.78" | 780 m || multiple || 2001–2020 || 23 Oct 2020 || 72 || align=left | Disc.: Spacewatch || 
|- id="2001 HH69" bgcolor=#fefefe
| 0 ||  || MBA-I || 18.66 || data-sort-value="0.55" | 550 m || multiple || 2001–2021 || 12 Sep 2021 || 92 || align=left | Disc.: Spacewatch || 
|- id="2001 HL69" bgcolor=#fefefe
| 0 ||  || MBA-I || 18.1 || data-sort-value="0.71" | 710 m || multiple || 2001–2019 || 15 Nov 2019 || 115 || align=left | Disc.: SDSS || 
|- id="2001 HM69" bgcolor=#fefefe
| 0 ||  || MBA-I || 18.63 || data-sort-value="0.56" | 560 m || multiple || 2001–2021 || 31 Aug 2021 || 65 || align=left | Disc.: Spacewatch || 
|- id="2001 HN69" bgcolor=#d6d6d6
| 0 ||  || MBA-O || 16.5 || 2.8 km || multiple || 2001–2020 || 09 Oct 2020 || 92 || align=left | Disc.: SDSS || 
|- id="2001 HP69" bgcolor=#fefefe
| 0 ||  || MBA-I || 18.1 || data-sort-value="0.71" | 710 m || multiple || 2001–2019 || 28 Dec 2019 || 54 || align=left | Disc.: Spacewatch || 
|- id="2001 HQ69" bgcolor=#fefefe
| 0 ||  || MBA-I || 17.6 || data-sort-value="0.90" | 900 m || multiple || 2001–2020 || 22 Mar 2020 || 61 || align=left | Disc.: SDSS || 
|- id="2001 HR69" bgcolor=#fefefe
| 0 ||  || MBA-I || 18.76 || data-sort-value="0.53" | 530 m || multiple || 2001–2022 || 09 Jan 2022 || 51 || align=left | Disc.: Spacewatch || 
|- id="2001 HS69" bgcolor=#fefefe
| 0 ||  || MBA-I || 18.6 || data-sort-value="0.57" | 570 m || multiple || 2001–2021 || 07 Jan 2021 || 48 || align=left | Disc.: SDSS || 
|- id="2001 HT69" bgcolor=#E9E9E9
| 0 ||  || MBA-M || 17.7 || 1.2 km || multiple || 2001–2020 || 15 Oct 2020 || 48 || align=left | Disc.: SDSS || 
|- id="2001 HU69" bgcolor=#d6d6d6
| 0 ||  || MBA-O || 17.06 || 2.2 km || multiple || 2001–2022 || 10 Jan 2022 || 55 || align=left | Disc.: SDSS || 
|- id="2001 HV69" bgcolor=#fefefe
| 0 ||  || MBA-I || 18.09 || data-sort-value="0.72" | 720 m || multiple || 2001–2021 || 11 Oct 2021 || 90 || align=left | Disc.: Spacewatch || 
|- id="2001 HW69" bgcolor=#d6d6d6
| 0 ||  || MBA-O || 17.0 || 2.2 km || multiple || 2001–2019 || 06 Sep 2019 || 46 || align=left | Disc.: SDSS || 
|- id="2001 HX69" bgcolor=#fefefe
| 0 ||  || MBA-I || 18.8 || data-sort-value="0.52" | 520 m || multiple || 2001–2020 || 10 Oct 2020 || 50 || align=left | Disc.: SDSS || 
|- id="2001 HY69" bgcolor=#E9E9E9
| 1 ||  || MBA-M || 18.0 || data-sort-value="0.75" | 750 m || multiple || 2001–2021 || 17 Jan 2021 || 41 || align=left | Disc.: SDSS || 
|- id="2001 HZ69" bgcolor=#fefefe
| 0 ||  || MBA-I || 18.9 || data-sort-value="0.49" | 490 m || multiple || 2001–2020 || 17 Nov 2020 || 36 || align=left | Disc.: Spacewatch || 
|- id="2001 HA70" bgcolor=#fefefe
| 0 ||  || MBA-I || 18.49 || data-sort-value="0.60" | 600 m || multiple || 2001–2021 || 30 Sep 2021 || 158 || align=left | Disc.: Spacewatch || 
|- id="2001 HC70" bgcolor=#fefefe
| 0 ||  || MBA-I || 18.4 || data-sort-value="0.62" | 620 m || multiple || 2001–2020 || 26 May 2020 || 56 || align=left | Disc.: SDSS || 
|- id="2001 HD70" bgcolor=#E9E9E9
| 0 ||  || MBA-M || 17.70 || data-sort-value="0.86" | 860 m || multiple || 2001–2021 || 03 Apr 2021 || 42 || align=left | Disc.: SDSS || 
|- id="2001 HF70" bgcolor=#E9E9E9
| 0 ||  || MBA-M || 17.1 || 1.1 km || multiple || 1997–2021 || 08 Jan 2021 || 112 || align=left | Disc.: Spacewatch || 
|- id="2001 HG70" bgcolor=#d6d6d6
| 0 ||  || MBA-O || 16.6 || 2.7 km || multiple || 2001–2021 || 08 Jan 2021 || 92 || align=left | Disc.: SDSS || 
|- id="2001 HH70" bgcolor=#fefefe
| 1 ||  || MBA-I || 17.8 || data-sort-value="0.82" | 820 m || multiple || 2001–2019 || 29 Oct 2019 || 62 || align=left | Disc.: Spacewatch || 
|- id="2001 HJ70" bgcolor=#fefefe
| 0 ||  || MBA-I || 18.43 || data-sort-value="0.61" | 610 m || multiple || 2001–2021 || 03 May 2021 || 88 || align=left | Disc.: SDSS || 
|- id="2001 HL70" bgcolor=#fefefe
| 0 ||  || MBA-I || 18.50 || data-sort-value="0.59" | 590 m || multiple || 2001–2021 || 06 May 2021 || 90 || align=left | Disc.: Spacewatch || 
|- id="2001 HN70" bgcolor=#E9E9E9
| 1 ||  || MBA-M || 17.8 || data-sort-value="0.82" | 820 m || multiple || 2001–2019 || 27 Oct 2019 || 44 || align=left | Disc.: Spacewatch || 
|- id="2001 HO70" bgcolor=#fefefe
| 0 ||  || MBA-I || 18.7 || data-sort-value="0.54" | 540 m || multiple || 2001–2019 || 27 Oct 2019 || 44 || align=left | Disc.: Astrovirtel || 
|- id="2001 HP70" bgcolor=#fefefe
| 0 ||  || MBA-I || 18.5 || data-sort-value="0.59" | 590 m || multiple || 2001–2019 || 05 Jun 2019 || 43 || align=left | Disc.: Spacewatch || 
|- id="2001 HQ70" bgcolor=#E9E9E9
| 0 ||  || MBA-M || 17.23 || 2.0 km || multiple || 2001–2021 || 31 Oct 2021 || 76 || align=left | Disc.: Spacewatch || 
|- id="2001 HR70" bgcolor=#E9E9E9
| 0 ||  || MBA-M || 17.78 || 1.2 km || multiple || 2001–2022 || 12 Jan 2022 || 45 || align=left | Disc.: SDSS || 
|- id="2001 HS70" bgcolor=#d6d6d6
| 0 ||  || MBA-O || 17.0 || 2.2 km || multiple || 2001–2019 || 30 Sep 2019 || 41 || align=left | Disc.: LPL/Spacewatch II || 
|- id="2001 HT70" bgcolor=#fefefe
| 1 ||  || MBA-I || 18.7 || data-sort-value="0.54" | 540 m || multiple || 2001–2020 || 14 Dec 2020 || 36 || align=left | Disc.: Spacewatch || 
|- id="2001 HV70" bgcolor=#d6d6d6
| 0 ||  || MBA-O || 16.84 || 2.4 km || multiple || 2001–2022 || 27 Jan 2022 || 86 || align=left | Disc.: SDSS || 
|- id="2001 HW70" bgcolor=#E9E9E9
| 0 ||  || MBA-M || 17.5 || data-sort-value="0.94" | 940 m || multiple || 2001–2019 || 03 Oct 2019 || 66 || align=left | Disc.: SDSS || 
|- id="2001 HX70" bgcolor=#E9E9E9
| 0 ||  || MBA-M || 17.34 || 1.9 km || multiple || 2001–2021 || 27 Oct 2021 || 88 || align=left | Disc.: Spacewatch || 
|- id="2001 HY70" bgcolor=#E9E9E9
| 0 ||  || MBA-M || 17.9 || 1.1 km || multiple || 2001–2020 || 11 Nov 2020 || 52 || align=left | Disc.: Astrovirtel || 
|- id="2001 HC71" bgcolor=#E9E9E9
| 0 ||  || MBA-M || 18.0 || 1.1 km || multiple || 2001–2021 || 18 Jan 2021 || 45 || align=left | Disc.: Astrovirtel || 
|- id="2001 HD71" bgcolor=#d6d6d6
| 0 ||  || MBA-O || 17.11 || 2.1 km || multiple || 2001–2022 || 26 Jan 2022 || 37 || align=left | Disc.: LPL/Spacewatch II || 
|- id="2001 HE71" bgcolor=#d6d6d6
| 0 ||  || MBA-O || 17.0 || 2.2 km || multiple || 2001–2019 || 24 Aug 2019 || 30 || align=left | Disc.: LPL/Spacewatch II || 
|- id="2001 HF71" bgcolor=#fefefe
| 0 ||  || MBA-I || 18.9 || data-sort-value="0.49" | 490 m || multiple || 2001–2020 || 07 Dec 2020 || 61 || align=left | Disc.: Spacewatch || 
|- id="2001 HG71" bgcolor=#E9E9E9
| 0 ||  || MBA-M || 18.11 || 1.0 km || multiple || 2001–2022 || 08 Jan 2022 || 39 || align=left | Disc.: SDSS || 
|- id="2001 HK71" bgcolor=#fefefe
| 0 ||  || MBA-I || 18.4 || data-sort-value="0.62" | 620 m || multiple || 2001–2020 || 11 Aug 2020 || 28 || align=left | Disc.: LPL/Spacewatch IIAdded on 5 November 2021 || 
|}
back to top

J 

|- id="2001 JV1" bgcolor=#FFC2E0
| 0 ||  || APO || 21.50 || data-sort-value="0.18" | 180 m || multiple || 2001–2021 || 31 Oct 2021 || 203 || align=left | Disc.: NEATPotentially hazardous object || 
|- id="2001 JW1" bgcolor=#FFC2E0
| 2 ||  || AMO || 20.3 || data-sort-value="0.31" | 310 m || multiple || 2001–2019 || 24 Dec 2019 || 132 || align=left | Disc.: AMOS || 
|- id="2001 JJ11" bgcolor=#E9E9E9
| 0 ||  || MBA-M || 17.5 || 1.3 km || multiple || 2001–2019 || 24 Oct 2019 || 36 || align=left | Disc.: Spacewatch || 
|- id="2001 JK11" bgcolor=#fefefe
| 0 ||  || MBA-I || 18.6 || data-sort-value="0.57" | 570 m || multiple || 2001–2019 || 05 Jun 2019 || 50 || align=left | Disc.: Spacewatch || 
|- id="2001 JL11" bgcolor=#E9E9E9
| 0 ||  || MBA-M || 16.7 || 1.9 km || multiple || 2001–2021 || 12 Jan 2021 || 56 || align=left | Disc.: NEAT || 
|- id="2001 JM11" bgcolor=#d6d6d6
| 0 ||  || MBA-O || 16.7 || 2.5 km || multiple || 2001–2019 || 04 Nov 2019 || 59 || align=left | Disc.: Spacewatch || 
|- id="2001 JN11" bgcolor=#d6d6d6
| 0 ||  || MBA-O || 16.8 || 2.4 km || multiple || 2001–2020 || 24 Mar 2020 || 66 || align=left | Disc.: Spacewatch || 
|- id="2001 JO11" bgcolor=#fefefe
| 4 ||  || MBA-I || 19.2 || data-sort-value="0.43" | 430 m || multiple || 2001–2019 || 05 Jun 2019 || 16 || align=left | Disc.: Spacewatch || 
|}
back to top

K 

|- id="2001 KX2" bgcolor=#FA8072
| 1 ||  || MCA || 16.4 || 2.9 km || multiple || 2001–2019 || 02 Jan 2019 || 110 || align=left | Disc.: LINEAR || 
|- id="2001 KO8" bgcolor=#fefefe
| 1 ||  || MBA-I || 17.6 || data-sort-value="0.90" | 900 m || multiple || 2001–2020 || 11 Nov 2020 || 43 || align=left | Disc.: LINEAR || 
|- id="2001 KB10" bgcolor=#fefefe
| 0 ||  || MBA-I || 17.99 || data-sort-value="0.75" | 750 m || multiple || 2001–2021 || 25 Sep 2021 || 174 || align=left | Disc.: LINEARAlt.: 2014 KO37, 2015 TM96 || 
|- id="2001 KJ18" bgcolor=#fefefe
| 0 ||  || MBA-I || 17.6 || data-sort-value="0.90" | 900 m || multiple || 1998–2021 || 18 Jan 2021 || 142 || align=left | Disc.: Spacewatch || 
|- id="2001 KW18" bgcolor=#FFC2E0
| 7 ||  || AMO || 26.0 || data-sort-value="0.022" | 22 m || single || 5 days || 23 May 2001 || 24 || align=left | Disc.: LONEOS || 
|- id="2001 KY18" bgcolor=#FFC2E0
| 0 ||  || AMO || 18.26 || data-sort-value="0.79" | 790 m || multiple || 2001–2022 || 26 Jan 2022 || 120 || align=left | Disc.: LINEARAdded on 24 December 2021NEO larger than 1 kilometer || 
|- id="2001 KM20" bgcolor=#FFC2E0
| 0 ||  || APO || 23.91 || data-sort-value="0.059" | 59 m || multiple || 2001–2019 || 04 Nov 2019 || 96 || align=left | Disc.: LINEAR || 
|- id="2001 KL32" bgcolor=#E9E9E9
| 0 ||  || MBA-M || 16.27 || 3.1 km || multiple || 2001–2021 || 09 Dec 2021 || 192 || align=left | Disc.: SpacewatchAlt.: 2010 BD113, 2010 GK118, 2012 XV26 || 
|- id="2001 KP32" bgcolor=#E9E9E9
| 0 ||  || MBA-M || 17.58 || data-sort-value="0.91" | 910 m || multiple || 2001–2021 || 20 May 2021 || 85 || align=left | Disc.: SpacewatchAlt.: 2005 JB116 || 
|- id="2001 KO41" bgcolor=#FFC2E0
| 6 ||  || AMO || 20.7 || data-sort-value="0.26" | 260 m || single || 26 days || 18 Jun 2001 || 55 || align=left | Disc.: AMOS || 
|- id="2001 KF54" bgcolor=#FFC2E0
| 1 ||  || APO || 20.1 || data-sort-value="0.34" | 340 m || multiple || 2001–2019 || 19 Dec 2019 || 71 || align=left | Disc.: SpacewatchPotentially hazardous object || 
|- id="2001 KD55" bgcolor=#FFC2E0
| 1 ||  || AMO || 20.6 || data-sort-value="0.27" | 270 m || multiple || 2001–2007 || 12 Mar 2007 || 51 || align=left | Disc.: LINEAR || 
|- id="2001 KU66" bgcolor=#FFC2E0
| 6 ||  || APO || 24.1 || data-sort-value="0.054" | 54 m || single || 4 days || 03 Jun 2001 || 61 || align=left | Disc.: SpacewatchAMO at MPC || 
|- id="2001 KX67" bgcolor=#FA8072
| 0 ||  || MCA || 16.6 || 2.7 km || multiple || 2001–2018 || 15 Dec 2018 || 403 || align=left | Disc.: NEAT || 
|- id="2001 KD68" bgcolor=#FFC2E0
| 8 ||  || AMO || 22.7 || data-sort-value="0.10" | 100 m || single || 19 days || 19 Jun 2001 || 20 || align=left | Disc.: NEAT || 
|- id="2001 KF76" bgcolor=#C2E0FF
| 3 ||  || TNO || 7.2 || 121 km || multiple || 2001–2007 || 19 May 2007 || 17 || align=left | Disc.: Cerro TololoLoUTNOs, cubewano (cold) || 
|- id="2001 KG76" bgcolor=#C2E0FF
| 2 ||  || TNO || 6.2 || 208 km || multiple || 2001–2008 || 09 May 2008 || 39 || align=left | Disc.: Cerro TololoLoUTNOs, res4:9, BR-mag: 1.92 || 
|- id="2001 KH76" bgcolor=#C2E0FF
| 3 ||  || TNO || 6.8 || 145 km || multiple || 2001–2006 || 20 Apr 2006 || 19 || align=left | Disc.: Cerro TololoLoUTNOs, cubewano (cold) || 
|- id="2001 KL76" bgcolor=#C2E0FF
| 4 ||  || TNO || 6.6 || 173 km || multiple || 2001–2008 || 30 May 2008 || 22 || align=left | Disc.: Cerro TololoLoUTNOs, res5:9 || 
|- id="2001 KM76" bgcolor=#C2E0FF
| E ||  || TNO || 7.1 || 130 km || single || 19 days || 10 Jun 2001 || 4 || align=left | Disc.: Cerro TololoLoUTNOs, cubewano? || 
|- id="2001 KQ76" bgcolor=#C2E0FF
| 3 ||  || TNO || 6.3 || 282 km || multiple || 2001–2020 || 15 May 2020 || 12 || align=left | Disc.: Cerro TololoLoUTNOs, cubewano (hot) || 
|- id="2001 KS76" bgcolor=#C2E0FF
| E ||  || TNO || 7.5 || 109 km || single || 17 days || 10 Jun 2001 || 4 || align=left | Disc.: Cerro TololoLoUTNOs, cubewano? || 
|- id="2001 KW76" bgcolor=#C2E0FF
| 2 ||  || TNO || 7.6 || 126 km || multiple || 2001–2008 || 05 May 2008 || 29 || align=left | Disc.: Cerro TololoLoUTNOs, other TNO || 
|- id="2001 KY76" bgcolor=#C2E0FF
| 5 ||  || TNO || 6.17 || 285 km || multiple || 2001–2022 || 04 Jul 2022 || 35 || align=left | Disc.: Cerro TololoLoUTNOs, plutino, BR-mag: 1.84 || 
|- id="2001 KZ76" bgcolor=#C2E0FF
| E ||  || TNO || 7.8 || 104 km || single || 17 days || 10 Jun 2001 || 4 || align=left | Disc.: Cerro TololoLoUTNOs, SDO || 
|- id="2001 KA77" bgcolor=#C2E0FF
| 4 ||  || TNO || 5.0 || 634 km || multiple || 2001–2006 || 05 Feb 2006 || 33 || align=left | Disc.: Cerro TololoLoUTNOs, cubewano (hot), albedo: 0.025; BR-mag: 1.82; taxonomy: RR || 
|- id="2001 KD77" bgcolor=#C2E0FF
| 2 ||  || TNO || 6.0 || 232 km || multiple || 2001–2016 || 29 May 2016 || 37 || align=left | Disc.: Cerro TololoLoUTNOs, plutino, albedo: 0.089; BR-mag: 1.77; taxonomy: RR || 
|- id="2001 KE77" bgcolor=#C2E0FF
| 3 ||  || TNO || 7.2 || 151 km || multiple || 2001–2008 || 04 May 2008 || 12 || align=left | Disc.: Cerro TololoLoUTNOs, other TNO || 
|- id="2001 KG77" bgcolor=#C2E0FF
| 4 ||  || TNO || 8.1 || 91 km || multiple || 2001–2003 || 01 May 2003 || 15 || align=left | Disc.: Cerro TololoLoUTNOs, SDO, BR-mag: 1.24 || 
|- id="2001 KO77" bgcolor=#C2E0FF
| 2 ||  || TNO || 7.9 || 109 km || multiple || 2001–2016 || 29 May 2016 || 27 || align=left | Disc.: Cerro TololoLoUTNOs, other TNO || 
|- id="2001 KU77" bgcolor=#fefefe
| 0 ||  || MBA-I || 17.67 || data-sort-value="0.87" | 870 m || multiple || 2001–2021 || 15 Apr 2021 || 179 || align=left | Disc.: SpacewatchAlt.: 2009 WN115, 2009 WT265, 2011 GA49 || 
|- id="2001 KB79" bgcolor=#d6d6d6
| 0 ||  || MBA-O || 16.6 || 2.7 km || multiple || 2001–2021 || 18 Jan 2021 || 118 || align=left | Disc.: SpacewatchAlt.: 2011 FN136 || 
|- id="2001 KF79" bgcolor=#E9E9E9
| 1 ||  || MBA-M || 18.0 || 1.4 km || multiple || 2001–2020 || 15 Oct 2020 || 34 || align=left | Disc.: Cerro TololoAdded on 17 January 2021 || 
|- id="2001 KR79" bgcolor=#d6d6d6
| 0 ||  || MBA-O || 16.9 || 2.3 km || multiple || 2001–2020 || 16 May 2020 || 108 || align=left | Disc.: Cerro Tololo || 
|- id="2001 KS79" bgcolor=#fefefe
| 0 ||  || MBA-I || 17.7 || data-sort-value="0.86" | 860 m || multiple || 2001–2019 || 03 Jun 2019 || 91 || align=left | Disc.: Spacewatch || 
|- id="2001 KU79" bgcolor=#E9E9E9
| 0 ||  || MBA-M || 16.8 || 1.8 km || multiple || 2001–2021 || 14 Jan 2021 || 163 || align=left | Disc.: Spacewatch || 
|- id="2001 KY79" bgcolor=#E9E9E9
| 0 ||  || MBA-M || 17.6 || 1.3 km || multiple || 2001–2021 || 12 Jun 2021 || 84 || align=left | Disc.: Cerro Tololo || 
|- id="2001 KB80" bgcolor=#d6d6d6
| 0 ||  || MBA-O || 16.37 || 3.0 km || multiple || 2001–2022 || 25 Jan 2022 || 185 || align=left | Disc.: SDSSAlt.: 2008 RK73, 2010 EH4 || 
|- id="2001 KC80" bgcolor=#d6d6d6
| 0 ||  || MBA-O || 16.6 || 2.7 km || multiple || 2001–2020 || 05 Nov 2020 || 104 || align=left | Disc.: Cerro Tololo || 
|- id="2001 KD80" bgcolor=#d6d6d6
| 0 ||  || MBA-O || 17.1 || 2.1 km || multiple || 2001–2020 || 26 Apr 2020 || 79 || align=left | Disc.: Cerro Tololo || 
|- id="2001 KE80" bgcolor=#E9E9E9
| 0 ||  || MBA-M || 17.2 || 2.0 km || multiple || 2001–2019 || 15 Nov 2019 || 95 || align=left | Disc.: Cerro Tololo || 
|- id="2001 KM80" bgcolor=#d6d6d6
| 0 ||  || MBA-O || 17.1 || 2.1 km || multiple || 2001–2020 || 27 Apr 2020 || 94 || align=left | Disc.: Cerro Tololo || 
|- id="2001 KN80" bgcolor=#E9E9E9
| 0 ||  || MBA-M || 17.40 || 1.8 km || multiple || 2001–2021 || 12 Sep 2021 || 118 || align=left | Disc.: Cerro Tololo || 
|- id="2001 KO80" bgcolor=#d6d6d6
| 0 ||  || MBA-O || 16.73 || 2.5 km || multiple || 2001–2021 || 02 Dec 2021 || 106 || align=left | Disc.: SDSS || 
|- id="2001 KP80" bgcolor=#d6d6d6
| 0 ||  || MBA-O || 16.5 || 2.8 km || multiple || 2001–2020 || 05 Nov 2020 || 82 || align=left | Disc.: Cerro Tololo || 
|- id="2001 KQ80" bgcolor=#fefefe
| 0 ||  || MBA-I || 18.6 || data-sort-value="0.57" | 570 m || multiple || 2001–2020 || 10 Dec 2020 || 81 || align=left | Disc.: Spacewatch || 
|- id="2001 KR80" bgcolor=#d6d6d6
| 0 ||  || MBA-O || 16.57 || 2.7 km || multiple || 2001–2021 || 17 Apr 2021 || 71 || align=left | Disc.: Spacewatch || 
|- id="2001 KS80" bgcolor=#d6d6d6
| 0 ||  || MBA-O || 16.6 || 2.7 km || multiple || 2001–2021 || 17 Jan 2021 || 67 || align=left | Disc.: SDSS || 
|- id="2001 KT80" bgcolor=#fefefe
| 0 ||  || MBA-I || 17.9 || data-sort-value="0.78" | 780 m || multiple || 2001–2020 || 16 Oct 2020 || 64 || align=left | Disc.: Cerro Tololo || 
|- id="2001 KU80" bgcolor=#d6d6d6
| 0 ||  || MBA-O || 16.42 || 2.9 km || multiple || 2001–2021 || 08 Sep 2021 || 125 || align=left | Disc.: NEAT || 
|- id="2001 KV80" bgcolor=#fefefe
| 1 ||  || MBA-I || 18.3 || data-sort-value="0.65" | 650 m || multiple || 2001–2021 || 12 Jan 2021 || 62 || align=left | Disc.: Cerro Tololo || 
|- id="2001 KY80" bgcolor=#E9E9E9
| 0 ||  || MBA-M || 18.15 || data-sort-value="0.99" | 990 m || multiple || 2001–2022 || 10 Jan 2022 || 53 || align=left | Disc.: SDSS || 
|- id="2001 KZ80" bgcolor=#E9E9E9
| 0 ||  || MBA-M || 17.0 || 1.7 km || multiple || 2001–2021 || 15 Jan 2021 || 113 || align=left | Disc.: Cerro Tololo || 
|- id="2001 KA81" bgcolor=#E9E9E9
| 0 ||  || MBA-M || 16.7 || 1.9 km || multiple || 2001–2021 || 04 Jan 2021 || 66 || align=left | Disc.: SDSS || 
|- id="2001 KB81" bgcolor=#E9E9E9
| 0 ||  || MBA-M || 17.4 || data-sort-value="0.98" | 980 m || multiple || 2001–2021 || 17 Jan 2021 || 78 || align=left | Disc.: SDSS || 
|- id="2001 KC81" bgcolor=#FA8072
| 0 ||  || MCA || 18.9 || data-sort-value="0.49" | 490 m || multiple || 2001–2017 || 13 Dec 2017 || 51 || align=left | Disc.: SDSS || 
|- id="2001 KE81" bgcolor=#d6d6d6
| 2 ||  || MBA-O || 17.4 || 1.8 km || multiple || 2001–2017 || 26 Dec 2017 || 52 || align=left | Disc.: Cerro Tololo || 
|- id="2001 KG81" bgcolor=#E9E9E9
| 0 ||  || MBA-M || 17.9 || data-sort-value="0.78" | 780 m || multiple || 2001–2021 || 18 Jan 2021 || 83 || align=left | Disc.: Cerro Tololo || 
|- id="2001 KJ81" bgcolor=#fefefe
| 0 ||  || MBA-I || 18.74 || data-sort-value="0.53" | 530 m || multiple || 2001–2021 || 09 Dec 2021 || 70 || align=left | Disc.: Cerro Tololo || 
|- id="2001 KK81" bgcolor=#fefefe
| 1 ||  || MBA-I || 18.2 || data-sort-value="0.68" | 680 m || multiple || 2001–2018 || 07 Mar 2018 || 52 || align=left | Disc.: Cerro Tololo || 
|- id="2001 KL81" bgcolor=#fefefe
| 0 ||  || MBA-I || 18.4 || data-sort-value="0.62" | 620 m || multiple || 2001–2020 || 15 Oct 2020 || 60 || align=left | Disc.: Spacewatch || 
|- id="2001 KN81" bgcolor=#fefefe
| 2 ||  || MBA-I || 18.9 || data-sort-value="0.49" | 490 m || multiple || 2001–2018 || 15 Dec 2018 || 55 || align=left | Disc.: Cerro Tololo || 
|- id="2001 KO81" bgcolor=#d6d6d6
| 0 ||  || MBA-O || 17.2 || 2.0 km || multiple || 2001–2020 || 21 Apr 2020 || 65 || align=left | Disc.: Spacewatch || 
|- id="2001 KP81" bgcolor=#fefefe
| 0 ||  || MBA-I || 18.5 || data-sort-value="0.59" | 590 m || multiple || 2001–2020 || 21 Jan 2020 || 47 || align=left | Disc.: Cerro Tololo || 
|- id="2001 KQ81" bgcolor=#d6d6d6
| 0 ||  || MBA-O || 16.86 || 2.4 km || multiple || 2001–2021 || 05 Dec 2021 || 114 || align=left | Disc.: Cerro Tololo || 
|- id="2001 KR81" bgcolor=#d6d6d6
| 0 ||  || MBA-O || 16.6 || 2.7 km || multiple || 2001–2021 || 14 Jan 2021 || 83 || align=left | Disc.: Cerro Tololo || 
|- id="2001 KS81" bgcolor=#d6d6d6
| 0 ||  || MBA-O || 17.0 || 2.2 km || multiple || 2001–2019 || 24 Oct 2019 || 58 || align=left | Disc.: Cerro Tololo || 
|- id="2001 KU81" bgcolor=#E9E9E9
| 0 ||  || MBA-M || 17.38 || data-sort-value="0.99" | 990 m || multiple || 2001–2021 || 14 Apr 2021 || 74 || align=left | Disc.: Cerro Tololo || 
|- id="2001 KV81" bgcolor=#fefefe
| 0 ||  || MBA-I || 18.1 || data-sort-value="0.71" | 710 m || multiple || 2001–2020 || 14 Oct 2020 || 68 || align=left | Disc.: SDSS || 
|- id="2001 KW81" bgcolor=#E9E9E9
| 0 ||  || MBA-M || 18.1 || data-sort-value="0.71" | 710 m || multiple || 1995–2021 || 18 Jan 2021 || 70 || align=left | Disc.: Cerro TololoAlt.: 2007 TK477 || 
|- id="2001 KX81" bgcolor=#fefefe
| 0 ||  || MBA-I || 18.73 || data-sort-value="0.53" | 530 m || multiple || 2001–2021 || 08 May 2021 || 69 || align=left | Disc.: Cerro Tololo || 
|- id="2001 KY81" bgcolor=#d6d6d6
| 0 ||  || MBA-O || 16.7 || 2.5 km || multiple || 2001–2019 || 26 Oct 2019 || 74 || align=left | Disc.: SDSS || 
|- id="2001 KZ81" bgcolor=#E9E9E9
| 0 ||  || MBA-M || 17.5 || 1.3 km || multiple || 2001–2020 || 19 Mar 2020 || 62 || align=left | Disc.: Cerro Tololo || 
|- id="2001 KA82" bgcolor=#E9E9E9
| 0 ||  || MBA-M || 17.3 || 1.0 km || multiple || 2001–2020 || 23 Jan 2020 || 58 || align=left | Disc.: Cerro Tololo || 
|- id="2001 KB82" bgcolor=#fefefe
| 0 ||  || MBA-I || 18.3 || data-sort-value="0.65" | 650 m || multiple || 2001–2021 || 13 Jun 2021 || 65 || align=left | Disc.: Spacewatch || 
|- id="2001 KC82" bgcolor=#d6d6d6
| 0 ||  || MBA-O || 17.31 || 1.9 km || multiple || 1996–2021 || 24 Oct 2021 || 81 || align=left | Disc.: Cerro Tololo || 
|- id="2001 KD82" bgcolor=#E9E9E9
| 0 ||  || MBA-M || 17.6 || 1.3 km || multiple || 2001–2019 || 21 Oct 2019 || 65 || align=left | Disc.: Cerro Tololo || 
|- id="2001 KE82" bgcolor=#fefefe
| 0 ||  || MBA-I || 18.98 || data-sort-value="0.48" | 480 m || multiple || 2001–2022 || 27 Jan 2022 || 59 || align=left | Disc.: Cerro Tololo || 
|- id="2001 KH82" bgcolor=#d6d6d6
| 0 ||  || MBA-O || 16.55 || 2.7 km || multiple || 2001–2022 || 23 Jan 2022 || 68 || align=left | Disc.: Spacewatch || 
|- id="2001 KJ82" bgcolor=#fefefe
| 0 ||  || MBA-I || 18.6 || data-sort-value="0.57" | 570 m || multiple || 1995–2018 || 13 Apr 2018 || 41 || align=left | Disc.: SpacewatchAlt.: 1995 SA88 || 
|- id="2001 KK82" bgcolor=#d6d6d6
| 0 ||  || MBA-O || 16.8 || 2.4 km || multiple || 2001–2020 || 12 Dec 2020 || 46 || align=left | Disc.: Spacewatch || 
|- id="2001 KL82" bgcolor=#fefefe
| 1 ||  || MBA-I || 17.5 || data-sort-value="0.94" | 940 m || multiple || 2001–2021 || 15 Jan 2021 || 54 || align=left | Disc.: LONEOS || 
|- id="2001 KM82" bgcolor=#E9E9E9
| 0 ||  || MBA-M || 17.36 || 1.9 km || multiple || 2001–2021 || 28 Nov 2021 || 97 || align=left | Disc.: SDSS || 
|- id="2001 KN82" bgcolor=#fefefe
| 0 ||  || MBA-I || 18.76 || data-sort-value="0.53" | 530 m || multiple || 2001–2021 || 30 Jul 2021 || 84 || align=left | Disc.: Spacewatch || 
|- id="2001 KO82" bgcolor=#E9E9E9
| 0 ||  || MBA-M || 17.44 || 1.4 km || multiple || 2001–2022 || 10 Jan 2022 || 72 || align=left | Disc.: Cerro Tololo || 
|- id="2001 KQ82" bgcolor=#E9E9E9
| 0 ||  || MBA-M || 18.3 || data-sort-value="0.65" | 650 m || multiple || 2001–2021 || 15 Jan 2021 || 60 || align=left | Disc.: Cerro Tololo || 
|- id="2001 KR82" bgcolor=#E9E9E9
| 0 ||  || MBA-M || 17.1 || 1.6 km || multiple || 2001–2021 || 06 Jan 2021 || 67 || align=left | Disc.: SDSS || 
|- id="2001 KS82" bgcolor=#fefefe
| 0 ||  || MBA-I || 18.2 || data-sort-value="0.68" | 680 m || multiple || 2001–2021 || 15 Jan 2021 || 57 || align=left | Disc.: Cerro Tololo || 
|- id="2001 KT82" bgcolor=#d6d6d6
| 0 ||  || MBA-O || 16.9 || 2.3 km || multiple || 2001–2019 || 23 Oct 2019 || 40 || align=left | Disc.: Cerro Tololo || 
|- id="2001 KU82" bgcolor=#d6d6d6
| 0 ||  || MBA-O || 17.64 || 1.7 km || multiple || 2001–2021 || 06 Nov 2021 || 59 || align=left | Disc.: Cerro Tololo || 
|- id="2001 KV82" bgcolor=#fefefe
| 1 ||  || MBA-I || 18.8 || data-sort-value="0.52" | 520 m || multiple || 2001–2020 || 13 Sep 2020 || 42 || align=left | Disc.: Cerro Tololo || 
|- id="2001 KW82" bgcolor=#fefefe
| 0 ||  || HUN || 18.6 || data-sort-value="0.57" | 570 m || multiple || 2001–2021 || 18 Jan 2021 || 49 || align=left | Disc.: Cerro Tololo || 
|- id="2001 KX82" bgcolor=#fefefe
| 0 ||  || MBA-I || 18.4 || data-sort-value="0.62" | 620 m || multiple || 2001–2019 || 02 Nov 2019 || 77 || align=left | Disc.: Cerro Tololo || 
|- id="2001 KY82" bgcolor=#fefefe
| 0 ||  || MBA-I || 19.1 || data-sort-value="0.45" | 450 m || multiple || 2001–2020 || 29 Apr 2020 || 49 || align=left | Disc.: Cerro Tololo || 
|- id="2001 KA83" bgcolor=#fefefe
| 0 ||  || MBA-I || 18.8 || data-sort-value="0.52" | 520 m || multiple || 1998–2020 || 16 Dec 2020 || 47 || align=left | Disc.: Cerro Tololo || 
|- id="2001 KD83" bgcolor=#fefefe
| 0 ||  || MBA-I || 18.1 || data-sort-value="0.71" | 710 m || multiple || 2001–2020 || 20 Oct 2020 || 69 || align=left | Disc.: Cerro Tololo || 
|- id="2001 KE83" bgcolor=#E9E9E9
| 2 ||  || MBA-M || 18.5 || data-sort-value="0.59" | 590 m || multiple || 2001–2018 || 13 Aug 2018 || 32 || align=left | Disc.: Cerro Tololo || 
|- id="2001 KF83" bgcolor=#fefefe
| 1 ||  || MBA-I || 18.8 || data-sort-value="0.52" | 520 m || multiple || 2001–2020 || 25 Oct 2020 || 39 || align=left | Disc.: Cerro Tololo || 
|- id="2001 KG83" bgcolor=#E9E9E9
| 0 ||  || MBA-M || 18.46 || data-sort-value="0.60" | 600 m || multiple || 2001–2021 || 09 May 2021 || 121 || align=left | Disc.: Cerro Tololo || 
|- id="2001 KH83" bgcolor=#E9E9E9
| 0 ||  || MBA-M || 17.8 || 1.2 km || multiple || 2001–2019 || 23 Oct 2019 || 36 || align=left | Disc.: Cerro Tololo || 
|- id="2001 KJ83" bgcolor=#fefefe
| 0 ||  || MBA-I || 18.4 || data-sort-value="0.62" | 620 m || multiple || 2001–2019 || 19 Sep 2019 || 35 || align=left | Disc.: Spacewatch || 
|- id="2001 KK83" bgcolor=#E9E9E9
| 0 ||  || MBA-M || 17.4 || 1.4 km || multiple || 2001–2021 || 10 Jan 2021 || 82 || align=left | Disc.: Cerro Tololo || 
|- id="2001 KL83" bgcolor=#fefefe
| 0 ||  || MBA-I || 18.25 || data-sort-value="0.67" | 670 m || multiple || 2001–2021 || 29 Oct 2021 || 86 || align=left | Disc.: Cerro Tololo || 
|- id="2001 KM83" bgcolor=#d6d6d6
| 0 ||  || MBA-O || 16.77 || 2.5 km || multiple || 2001–2021 || 28 Nov 2021 || 62 || align=left | Disc.: SDSS || 
|- id="2001 KN83" bgcolor=#d6d6d6
| 0 ||  || MBA-O || 17.1 || 2.1 km || multiple || 2001–2020 || 08 Dec 2020 || 41 || align=left | Disc.: Cerro Tololo || 
|- id="2001 KO83" bgcolor=#fefefe
| 0 ||  || MBA-I || 18.5 || data-sort-value="0.59" | 590 m || multiple || 2001–2020 || 18 Oct 2020 || 54 || align=left | Disc.: Cerro Tololo || 
|- id="2001 KQ83" bgcolor=#E9E9E9
| 0 ||  || MBA-M || 17.79 || 1.2 km || multiple || 2001–2020 || 24 Dec 2020 || 83 || align=left | Disc.: Cerro Tololo || 
|- id="2001 KR83" bgcolor=#fefefe
| 0 ||  || MBA-I || 17.8 || data-sort-value="0.82" | 820 m || multiple || 2001–2020 || 21 Jan 2020 || 106 || align=left | Disc.: SDSS || 
|- id="2001 KT83" bgcolor=#d6d6d6
| 0 ||  || MBA-O || 16.7 || 2.5 km || multiple || 2001–2021 || 08 Jan 2021 || 93 || align=left | Disc.: SDSS || 
|- id="2001 KU83" bgcolor=#fefefe
| 0 ||  || MBA-I || 18.15 || data-sort-value="0.70" | 700 m || multiple || 2001–2021 || 06 Nov 2021 || 139 || align=left | Disc.: Cerro Tololo || 
|- id="2001 KV83" bgcolor=#E9E9E9
| 1 ||  || MBA-M || 17.8 || data-sort-value="0.82" | 820 m || multiple || 2001–2020 || 14 Feb 2020 || 88 || align=left | Disc.: Cerro Tololo || 
|- id="2001 KX83" bgcolor=#d6d6d6
| 0 ||  || MBA-O || 16.14 || 3.3 km || multiple || 2001–2021 || 10 Apr 2021 || 106 || align=left | Disc.: SDSSAlt.: 2008 VC68 || 
|- id="2001 KZ83" bgcolor=#d6d6d6
| 0 ||  || MBA-O || 16.3 || 3.1 km || multiple || 2001–2020 || 23 Dec 2020 || 83 || align=left | Disc.: Kitt Peak Obs. || 
|- id="2001 KA84" bgcolor=#fefefe
| 0 ||  || MBA-I || 18.17 || data-sort-value="0.69" | 690 m || multiple || 2001–2021 || 11 May 2021 || 100 || align=left | Disc.: Cerro Tololo || 
|- id="2001 KC84" bgcolor=#d6d6d6
| 0 ||  || MBA-O || 16.1 || 3.4 km || multiple || 2001–2020 || 05 Nov 2020 || 85 || align=left | Disc.: LPL/Spacewatch II || 
|- id="2001 KD84" bgcolor=#E9E9E9
| 0 ||  || MBA-M || 17.4 || 1.4 km || multiple || 2001–2019 || 27 Oct 2019 || 69 || align=left | Disc.: Cerro Tololo || 
|- id="2001 KG84" bgcolor=#d6d6d6
| 0 ||  || MBA-O || 16.88 || 2.3 km || multiple || 2001–2021 || 30 May 2021 || 107 || align=left | Disc.: LPL/Spacewatch II || 
|- id="2001 KH84" bgcolor=#d6d6d6
| 0 ||  || MBA-O || 16.5 || 2.8 km || multiple || 2001–2020 || 06 Dec 2020 || 87 || align=left | Disc.: SDSS || 
|- id="2001 KJ84" bgcolor=#d6d6d6
| 0 ||  || MBA-O || 16.1 || 3.4 km || multiple || 2001–2021 || 17 Jan 2021 || 84 || align=left | Disc.: SDSS || 
|- id="2001 KK84" bgcolor=#E9E9E9
| 0 ||  || MBA-M || 17.9 || 1.1 km || multiple || 2000–2020 || 21 Jan 2020 || 66 || align=left | Disc.: Cerro Tololo || 
|- id="2001 KL84" bgcolor=#FA8072
| 1 ||  || MCA || 18.3 || data-sort-value="0.65" | 650 m || multiple || 2001–2020 || 26 Jan 2020 || 74 || align=left | Disc.: Cerro Tololo || 
|- id="2001 KM84" bgcolor=#E9E9E9
| 0 ||  || MBA-M || 16.97 || 2.2 km || multiple || 2001–2021 || 30 Nov 2021 || 139 || align=left | Disc.: Cerro Tololo || 
|- id="2001 KO84" bgcolor=#E9E9E9
| 0 ||  || MBA-M || 17.69 || data-sort-value="0.86" | 860 m || multiple || 1993–2021 || 15 Apr 2021 || 86 || align=left | Disc.: Spacewatch || 
|- id="2001 KP84" bgcolor=#E9E9E9
| 0 ||  || MBA-M || 17.9 || 1.5 km || multiple || 2001–2019 || 30 Jun 2019 || 64 || align=left | Disc.: SDSS || 
|- id="2001 KQ84" bgcolor=#E9E9E9
| 0 ||  || MBA-M || 17.4 || 1.8 km || multiple || 1998–2020 || 11 Oct 2020 || 84 || align=left | Disc.: Cerro Tololo || 
|- id="2001 KR84" bgcolor=#fefefe
| 0 ||  || HUN || 19.01 || data-sort-value="0.47" | 470 m || multiple || 2001–2019 || 21 May 2019 || 60 || align=left | Disc.: SDSS || 
|- id="2001 KS84" bgcolor=#fefefe
| 0 ||  || MBA-I || 17.8 || data-sort-value="0.82" | 820 m || multiple || 2001–2021 || 15 Jan 2021 || 74 || align=left | Disc.: Cerro Tololo || 
|- id="2001 KV84" bgcolor=#fefefe
| 0 ||  || MBA-I || 17.5 || data-sort-value="0.94" | 940 m || multiple || 2001–2020 || 22 Dec 2020 || 73 || align=left | Disc.: Cerro Tololo || 
|- id="2001 KX84" bgcolor=#E9E9E9
| 0 ||  || MBA-M || 17.5 || 1.3 km || multiple || 2001–2020 || 21 Oct 2020 || 161 || align=left | Disc.: Cerro TololoAlt.: 2010 NF21 || 
|- id="2001 KZ84" bgcolor=#d6d6d6
| 0 ||  || MBA-O || 17.2 || 2.0 km || multiple || 2001–2021 || 18 Jan 2021 || 71 || align=left | Disc.: Cerro Tololo || 
|- id="2001 KB85" bgcolor=#d6d6d6
| 0 ||  || MBA-O || 17.2 || 2.0 km || multiple || 2001–2021 || 17 Jan 2021 || 51 || align=left | Disc.: Cerro Tololo || 
|- id="2001 KC85" bgcolor=#E9E9E9
| 1 ||  || MBA-M || 18.5 || data-sort-value="0.84" | 840 m || multiple || 2001–2019 || 25 Nov 2019 || 46 || align=left | Disc.: Cerro Tololo || 
|- id="2001 KD85" bgcolor=#E9E9E9
| 0 ||  || MBA-M || 17.5 || 1.8 km || multiple || 2001–2020 || 14 Dec 2020 || 54 || align=left | Disc.: Cerro Tololo || 
|- id="2001 KE85" bgcolor=#fefefe
| 0 ||  || MBA-I || 18.3 || data-sort-value="0.65" | 650 m || multiple || 2001–2020 || 14 Nov 2020 || 65 || align=left | Disc.: Cerro Tololo || 
|- id="2001 KF85" bgcolor=#fefefe
| 1 ||  || MBA-I || 18.6 || data-sort-value="0.57" | 570 m || multiple || 2001–2019 || 04 Jul 2019 || 51 || align=left | Disc.: Spacewatch || 
|- id="2001 KH85" bgcolor=#fefefe
| 0 ||  || MBA-I || 18.1 || data-sort-value="0.71" | 710 m || multiple || 2001–2019 || 08 Nov 2019 || 52 || align=left | Disc.: Cerro Tololo || 
|- id="2001 KJ85" bgcolor=#E9E9E9
| 0 ||  || MBA-M || 18.15 || data-sort-value="0.99" | 990 m || multiple || 2001–2019 || 25 Jul 2019 || 55 || align=left | Disc.: Cerro Tololo || 
|- id="2001 KK85" bgcolor=#E9E9E9
| 0 ||  || MBA-M || 17.4 || 1.8 km || multiple || 2001–2020 || 20 Oct 2020 || 56 || align=left | Disc.: Spacewatch || 
|- id="2001 KL85" bgcolor=#fefefe
| 1 ||  || HUN || 18.7 || data-sort-value="0.54" | 540 m || multiple || 2001–2019 || 24 Jan 2019 || 45 || align=left | Disc.: SDSS || 
|- id="2001 KN85" bgcolor=#E9E9E9
| 0 ||  || MBA-M || 18.1 || 1.0 km || multiple || 2001–2019 || 28 Nov 2019 || 47 || align=left | Disc.: Cerro Tololo || 
|- id="2001 KP85" bgcolor=#E9E9E9
| 0 ||  || MBA-M || 18.0 || 1.1 km || multiple || 2001–2019 || 28 Nov 2019 || 44 || align=left | Disc.: Cerro Tololo || 
|- id="2001 KQ85" bgcolor=#d6d6d6
| 0 ||  || MBA-O || 16.80 || 2.4 km || multiple || 2001–2022 || 25 Jan 2022 || 66 || align=left | Disc.: SDSS || 
|- id="2001 KR85" bgcolor=#fefefe
| 0 ||  || MBA-I || 19.06 || data-sort-value="0.46" | 460 m || multiple || 2001–2022 || 27 Jan 2022 || 55 || align=left | Disc.: Cerro Tololo || 
|- id="2001 KT85" bgcolor=#d6d6d6
| 0 ||  || MBA-O || 17.0 || 2.2 km || multiple || 2001–2018 || 12 Aug 2018 || 38 || align=left | Disc.: Cerro Tololo || 
|- id="2001 KU85" bgcolor=#d6d6d6
| 0 ||  || MBA-O || 16.6 || 2.7 km || multiple || 2001–2020 || 26 Oct 2020 || 46 || align=left | Disc.: SDSS || 
|- id="2001 KV85" bgcolor=#E9E9E9
| 1 ||  || MBA-M || 17.7 || 1.6 km || multiple || 2001–2019 || 21 Sep 2019 || 43 || align=left | Disc.: Cerro Tololo || 
|- id="2001 KW85" bgcolor=#d6d6d6
| 0 ||  || MBA-O || 17.3 || 1.9 km || multiple || 2001–2019 || 04 Dec 2019 || 48 || align=left | Disc.: Cerro Tololo || 
|- id="2001 KX85" bgcolor=#fefefe
| 0 ||  || MBA-I || 19.48 || data-sort-value="0.38" | 380 m || multiple || 2001–2021 || 04 Oct 2021 || 53 || align=left | Disc.: Cerro Tololo || 
|- id="2001 KY85" bgcolor=#d6d6d6
| 0 ||  || MBA-O || 16.8 || 2.4 km || multiple || 2001–2019 || 04 Feb 2019 || 39 || align=left | Disc.: Cerro Tololo || 
|- id="2001 KZ85" bgcolor=#fefefe
| 0 ||  || MBA-I || 18.2 || data-sort-value="0.68" | 680 m || multiple || 2001–2019 || 28 May 2019 || 50 || align=left | Disc.: SDSS || 
|- id="2001 KA86" bgcolor=#E9E9E9
| 0 ||  || MBA-M || 17.5 || 1.3 km || multiple || 2001–2019 || 04 Nov 2019 || 80 || align=left | Disc.: SDSSAlt.: 2010 JX18 || 
|- id="2001 KB86" bgcolor=#E9E9E9
| 1 ||  || MBA-M || 18.3 || data-sort-value="0.65" | 650 m || multiple || 2001–2020 || 28 Jan 2020 || 60 || align=left | Disc.: Cerro Tololo || 
|- id="2001 KC86" bgcolor=#fefefe
| 0 ||  || MBA-I || 18.72 || data-sort-value="0.54" | 540 m || multiple || 2001–2021 || 11 Oct 2021 || 80 || align=left | Disc.: Cerro Tololo || 
|- id="2001 KD86" bgcolor=#E9E9E9
| 0 ||  || MBA-M || 18.46 || data-sort-value="0.60" | 600 m || multiple || 2001–2021 || 17 Apr 2021 || 45 || align=left | Disc.: Cerro Tololo || 
|- id="2001 KE86" bgcolor=#E9E9E9
| 1 ||  || MBA-M || 17.8 || data-sort-value="0.82" | 820 m || multiple || 2001–2020 || 21 Apr 2020 || 52 || align=left | Disc.: Cerro Tololo || 
|- id="2001 KF86" bgcolor=#d6d6d6
| 0 ||  || MBA-O || 17.4 || 1.8 km || multiple || 2001–2019 || 28 Nov 2019 || 48 || align=left | Disc.: Cerro Tololo || 
|- id="2001 KG86" bgcolor=#d6d6d6
| 0 ||  || MBA-O || 16.55 || 2.7 km || multiple || 2001–2021 || 06 Apr 2021 || 79 || align=left | Disc.: SDSS || 
|- id="2001 KJ86" bgcolor=#E9E9E9
| 0 ||  || MBA-M || 17.4 || 1.4 km || multiple || 2001–2019 || 31 Oct 2019 || 38 || align=left | Disc.: SDSS || 
|- id="2001 KK86" bgcolor=#fefefe
| 0 ||  || MBA-I || 18.7 || data-sort-value="0.54" | 540 m || multiple || 2001–2020 || 22 Oct 2020 || 34 || align=left | Disc.: Cerro Tololo || 
|- id="2001 KL86" bgcolor=#d6d6d6
| 0 ||  || MBA-O || 17.4 || 1.8 km || multiple || 2001–2019 || 29 Oct 2019 || 47 || align=left | Disc.: Cerro Tololo || 
|- id="2001 KM86" bgcolor=#E9E9E9
| 0 ||  || MBA-M || 18.0 || 1.1 km || multiple || 2001–2019 || 29 Oct 2019 || 35 || align=left | Disc.: Cerro Tololo || 
|- id="2001 KN86" bgcolor=#fefefe
| 0 ||  || MBA-I || 18.1 || data-sort-value="0.71" | 710 m || multiple || 2001–2020 || 21 Jul 2020 || 43 || align=left | Disc.: Cerro Tololo || 
|- id="2001 KO86" bgcolor=#fefefe
| 3 ||  || MBA-I || 19.1 || data-sort-value="0.45" | 450 m || multiple || 2001–2019 || 05 Oct 2019 || 35 || align=left | Disc.: Cerro Tololo || 
|- id="2001 KP86" bgcolor=#E9E9E9
| 0 ||  || MBA-M || 18.1 || 1.0 km || multiple || 2001–2019 || 31 Oct 2019 || 47 || align=left | Disc.: Cerro Tololo || 
|- id="2001 KQ86" bgcolor=#E9E9E9
| 0 ||  || MBA-M || 17.78 || data-sort-value="0.83" | 830 m || multiple || 1998–2021 || 07 Apr 2021 || 68 || align=left | Disc.: Cerro Tololo || 
|- id="2001 KR86" bgcolor=#E9E9E9
| 2 ||  || MBA-M || 18.1 || data-sort-value="0.71" | 710 m || multiple || 2001–2021 || 10 Apr 2021 || 51 || align=left | Disc.: Spacewatch || 
|- id="2001 KT86" bgcolor=#E9E9E9
| 0 ||  || MBA-M || 18.0 || 1.1 km || multiple || 2001–2018 || 11 Nov 2018 || 34 || align=left | Disc.: Cerro Tololo || 
|- id="2001 KV86" bgcolor=#fefefe
| 0 ||  || MBA-I || 18.3 || data-sort-value="0.65" | 650 m || multiple || 2001–2020 || 10 Oct 2020 || 55 || align=left | Disc.: Cerro Tololo || 
|- id="2001 KW86" bgcolor=#d6d6d6
| 0 ||  || MBA-O || 17.1 || 2.1 km || multiple || 2001–2018 || 16 Jun 2018 || 36 || align=left | Disc.: SDSS || 
|- id="2001 KX86" bgcolor=#d6d6d6
| 0 ||  || MBA-O || 17.2 || 2.0 km || multiple || 2001–2019 || 19 Sep 2019 || 26 || align=left | Disc.: Cerro Tololo || 
|- id="2001 KY86" bgcolor=#fefefe
| 0 ||  || MBA-I || 19.0 || data-sort-value="0.47" | 470 m || multiple || 2001–2019 || 19 Dec 2019 || 39 || align=left | Disc.: Cerro Tololo || 
|- id="2001 KZ86" bgcolor=#fefefe
| 1 ||  || MBA-I || 18.5 || data-sort-value="0.59" | 590 m || multiple || 2001–2018 || 11 Jul 2018 || 28 || align=left | Disc.: Cerro Tololo || 
|- id="2001 KA87" bgcolor=#d6d6d6
| 2 ||  || HIL || 15.8 || 3.9 km || multiple || 2001–2018 || 13 Dec 2018 || 27 || align=left | Disc.: Cerro Tololo || 
|- id="2001 KB87" bgcolor=#fefefe
| 0 ||  || MBA-I || 19.05 || data-sort-value="0.46" | 460 m || multiple || 2001–2021 || 10 May 2021 || 44 || align=left | Disc.: SDSS || 
|- id="2001 KC87" bgcolor=#fefefe
| 0 ||  || MBA-I || 19.24 || data-sort-value="0.42" | 420 m || multiple || 2001–2021 || 15 May 2021 || 57 || align=left | Disc.: Cerro Tololo || 
|- id="2001 KF87" bgcolor=#E9E9E9
| 0 ||  || MBA-M || 17.1 || 2.1 km || multiple || 2001–2019 || 04 Oct 2019 || 80 || align=left | Disc.: Cerro Tololo || 
|- id="2001 KH87" bgcolor=#d6d6d6
| 0 ||  || MBA-O || 17.2 || 2.0 km || multiple || 2001–2021 || 08 Jun 2021 || 84 || align=left | Disc.: Cerro Tololo || 
|- id="2001 KK87" bgcolor=#d6d6d6
| 0 ||  || MBA-O || 17.09 || 2.1 km || multiple || 2001–2019 || 03 Oct 2019 || 347 || align=left | Disc.: Cerro Tololo || 
|- id="2001 KM87" bgcolor=#fefefe
| 1 ||  || MBA-I || 19.0 || data-sort-value="0.47" | 470 m || multiple || 2001–2019 || 30 Jun 2019 || 50 || align=left | Disc.: Cerro Tololo || 
|- id="2001 KP87" bgcolor=#d6d6d6
| 0 ||  || MBA-O || 16.9 || 2.3 km || multiple || 2001–2020 || 06 Dec 2020 || 63 || align=left | Disc.: Cerro Tololo || 
|- id="2001 KQ87" bgcolor=#E9E9E9
| 0 ||  || MBA-M || 17.5 || 1.8 km || multiple || 2001–2019 || 24 Aug 2019 || 39 || align=left | Disc.: Cerro Tololo || 
|- id="2001 KR87" bgcolor=#E9E9E9
| 0 ||  || MBA-M || 17.8 || 1.5 km || multiple || 2001–2020 || 14 Nov 2020 || 62 || align=left | Disc.: Cerro Tololo || 
|- id="2001 KS87" bgcolor=#E9E9E9
| 0 ||  || MBA-M || 17.3 || 1.9 km || multiple || 2001–2020 || 08 Dec 2020 || 49 || align=left | Disc.: Cerro Tololo || 
|- id="2001 KT87" bgcolor=#d6d6d6
| 0 ||  || MBA-O || 16.73 || 2.5 km || multiple || 2001–2022 || 27 Jan 2022 || 47 || align=left | Disc.: SDSS || 
|- id="2001 KU87" bgcolor=#E9E9E9
| 0 ||  || MBA-M || 17.6 || 1.3 km || multiple || 2001–2019 || 24 Oct 2019 || 41 || align=left | Disc.: Spacewatch || 
|- id="2001 KV87" bgcolor=#fefefe
| 0 ||  || MBA-I || 18.0 || data-sort-value="0.75" | 750 m || multiple || 2001–2021 || 14 Jan 2021 || 48 || align=left | Disc.: Spacewatch || 
|- id="2001 KX87" bgcolor=#E9E9E9
| 0 ||  || MBA-M || 17.7 || data-sort-value="0.86" | 860 m || multiple || 2001–2020 || 10 Dec 2020 || 29 || align=left | Disc.: SDSS || 
|- id="2001 KY87" bgcolor=#d6d6d6
| 0 ||  || MBA-O || 17.1 || 2.1 km || multiple || 2001–2021 || 11 Jan 2021 || 36 || align=left | Disc.: Cerro Tololo || 
|- id="2001 KZ87" bgcolor=#E9E9E9
| 0 ||  || MBA-M || 17.3 || 1.9 km || multiple || 2001–2020 || 16 Nov 2020 || 75 || align=left | Disc.: Cerro Tololo || 
|- id="2001 KA88" bgcolor=#d6d6d6
| 0 ||  || MBA-O || 17.7 || 1.6 km || multiple || 2001–2019 || 06 Sep 2019 || 21 || align=left | Disc.: Cerro Tololo || 
|- id="2001 KB88" bgcolor=#fefefe
| 0 ||  || MBA-I || 17.9 || data-sort-value="0.78" | 780 m || multiple || 2001–2020 || 20 Oct 2020 || 108 || align=left | Disc.: Cerro Tololo || 
|- id="2001 KC88" bgcolor=#d6d6d6
| 0 ||  || MBA-O || 16.58 || 2.7 km || multiple || 2001–2021 || 09 Dec 2021 || 129 || align=left | Disc.: Cerro Tololo || 
|- id="2001 KE88" bgcolor=#E9E9E9
| 0 ||  || MBA-M || 17.8 || 1.2 km || multiple || 2001–2019 || 29 Sep 2019 || 49 || align=left | Disc.: Cerro Tololo || 
|- id="2001 KF88" bgcolor=#d6d6d6
| 0 ||  || MBA-O || 17.12 || 2.1 km || multiple || 2001–2021 || 11 Jun 2021 || 78 || align=left | Disc.: Cerro Tololo || 
|- id="2001 KG88" bgcolor=#d6d6d6
| 0 ||  || MBA-O || 17.6 || 1.7 km || multiple || 2001–2021 || 18 Jan 2021 || 45 || align=left | Disc.: Cerro Tololo || 
|- id="2001 KH88" bgcolor=#d6d6d6
| 0 ||  || MBA-O || 16.5 || 2.8 km || multiple || 2001–2020 || 19 Nov 2020 || 66 || align=left | Disc.: Cerro Tololo || 
|- id="2001 KJ88" bgcolor=#fefefe
| 0 ||  || MBA-I || 18.6 || data-sort-value="0.57" | 570 m || multiple || 2001–2018 || 16 Jan 2018 || 37 || align=left | Disc.: Kitt Peak Obs. || 
|- id="2001 KK88" bgcolor=#E9E9E9
| 0 ||  || MBA-M || 18.3 || data-sort-value="0.92" | 920 m || multiple || 2001–2019 || 04 Sep 2019 || 34 || align=left | Disc.: SDSS || 
|- id="2001 KL88" bgcolor=#E9E9E9
| 0 ||  || MBA-M || 18.5 || data-sort-value="0.59" | 590 m || multiple || 2001–2018 || 08 Aug 2018 || 30 || align=left | Disc.: Cerro Tololo || 
|- id="2001 KM88" bgcolor=#fefefe
| 1 ||  || MBA-I || 19.9 || data-sort-value="0.31" | 310 m || multiple || 2001–2020 || 20 Jul 2020 || 32 || align=left | Disc.: Cerro Tololo || 
|- id="2001 KN88" bgcolor=#E9E9E9
| 0 ||  || MBA-M || 17.8 || 1.2 km || multiple || 2001–2019 || 27 Oct 2019 || 27 || align=left | Disc.: Cerro Tololo || 
|- id="2001 KO88" bgcolor=#d6d6d6
| 0 ||  || MBA-O || 17.4 || 1.8 km || multiple || 2001–2021 || 16 Jan 2021 || 31 || align=left | Disc.: Cerro Tololo || 
|- id="2001 KP88" bgcolor=#d6d6d6
| 0 ||  || MBA-O || 17.2 || 2.0 km || multiple || 2001–2020 || 23 Dec 2020 || 31 || align=left | Disc.: Cerro Tololo || 
|- id="2001 KQ88" bgcolor=#E9E9E9
| 0 ||  || MBA-M || 17.20 || 2.0 km || multiple || 1995–2022 || 25 Jan 2022 || 216 || align=left | Disc.: Cerro TololoAlt.: 2010 JY139 || 
|- id="2001 KR88" bgcolor=#d6d6d6
| 0 ||  || MBA-O || 16.5 || 2.8 km || multiple || 2001–2020 || 24 Dec 2020 || 90 || align=left | Disc.: LPL/Spacewatch II || 
|- id="2001 KT88" bgcolor=#d6d6d6
| 0 ||  || MBA-O || 16.9 || 2.3 km || multiple || 2001–2019 || 25 Oct 2019 || 62 || align=left | Disc.: Cerro Tololo || 
|- id="2001 KU88" bgcolor=#E9E9E9
| 0 ||  || MBA-M || 17.4 || 1.4 km || multiple || 2001–2021 || 18 Jan 2021 || 78 || align=left | Disc.: Cerro Tololo || 
|- id="2001 KV88" bgcolor=#E9E9E9
| 0 ||  || MBA-M || 16.9 || 1.8 km || multiple || 2001–2021 || 06 Jun 2021 || 101 || align=left | Disc.: Cerro Tololo || 
|- id="2001 KW88" bgcolor=#d6d6d6
| 0 ||  || MBA-O || 16.8 || 2.4 km || multiple || 2001–2019 || 27 Oct 2019 || 58 || align=left | Disc.: Cerro Tololo || 
|- id="2001 KX88" bgcolor=#fefefe
| 0 ||  || MBA-I || 18.5 || data-sort-value="0.59" | 590 m || multiple || 2001–2020 || 21 Jan 2020 || 47 || align=left | Disc.: SDSS || 
|- id="2001 KY88" bgcolor=#fefefe
| 0 ||  || MBA-I || 18.5 || data-sort-value="0.59" | 590 m || multiple || 2001–2020 || 15 Oct 2020 || 55 || align=left | Disc.: Spacewatch || 
|- id="2001 KZ88" bgcolor=#d6d6d6
| 0 ||  || MBA-O || 17.3 || 1.9 km || multiple || 2001–2019 || 05 Nov 2019 || 49 || align=left | Disc.: Cerro Tololo || 
|- id="2001 KA89" bgcolor=#fefefe
| 0 ||  || MBA-I || 18.0 || data-sort-value="0.75" | 750 m || multiple || 2001–2019 || 24 Aug 2019 || 46 || align=left | Disc.: Cerro Tololo || 
|- id="2001 KB89" bgcolor=#d6d6d6
| 0 ||  || MBA-O || 17.5 || 1.8 km || multiple || 2001–2020 || 22 Jan 2020 || 36 || align=left | Disc.: Cerro Tololo || 
|- id="2001 KC89" bgcolor=#E9E9E9
| 1 ||  || MBA-M || 17.8 || 1.2 km || multiple || 2001–2020 || 15 Oct 2020 || 60 || align=left | Disc.: Cerro Tololo || 
|- id="2001 KD89" bgcolor=#fefefe
| 1 ||  || MBA-I || 19.0 || data-sort-value="0.47" | 470 m || multiple || 2001–2019 || 25 Sep 2019 || 37 || align=left | Disc.: Cerro Tololo || 
|- id="2001 KE89" bgcolor=#fefefe
| 0 ||  || MBA-I || 18.70 || data-sort-value="0.54" | 540 m || multiple || 2001–2021 || 07 Nov 2021 || 35 || align=left | Disc.: Cerro Tololo || 
|- id="2001 KF89" bgcolor=#fefefe
| 1 ||  || MBA-I || 18.8 || data-sort-value="0.52" | 520 m || multiple || 2001–2016 || 19 Nov 2016 || 47 || align=left | Disc.: Cerro Tololo || 
|- id="2001 KG89" bgcolor=#fefefe
| 0 ||  || MBA-I || 19.31 || data-sort-value="0.41" | 410 m || multiple || 2001–2021 || 04 Oct 2021 || 34 || align=left | Disc.: Cerro Tololo || 
|- id="2001 KJ89" bgcolor=#fefefe
| 3 ||  || MBA-I || 19.4 || data-sort-value="0.39" | 390 m || multiple || 2001–2015 || 18 Sep 2015 || 34 || align=left | Disc.: Cerro TololoAdded on 13 September 2020 || 
|- id="2001 KK89" bgcolor=#d6d6d6
| 0 ||  || MBA-O || 17.35 || 1.9 km || multiple || 2001–2021 || 11 Jun 2021 || 74 || align=left | Disc.: Cerro Tololo Obs.Added on 19 October 2020 || 
|- id="2001 KN89" bgcolor=#E9E9E9
| 0 ||  || MBA-M || 17.6 || 1.7 km || multiple || 2001–2021 || 05 Feb 2021 || 63 || align=left | Disc.: Cerro TololoAdded on 9 March 2021 || 
|- id="2001 KO89" bgcolor=#d6d6d6
| 0 ||  || MBA-O || 17.3 || 1.9 km || multiple || 2001–2021 || 08 May 2021 || 53 || align=left | Disc.: Cerro TololoAdded on 17 June 2021 || 
|- id="2001 KQ89" bgcolor=#d6d6d6
| 1 ||  || MBA-O || 17.47 || 1.8 km || multiple || 2001–2023 || 15 Mar 2023 || 38 || align=left | Disc.: Cerro TololoAdded on 29 January 2022 || 
|- id="2001 KR89" bgcolor=#E9E9E9
| 0 ||  || MBA-M || 18.71 || data-sort-value="0.54" | 540 m || multiple || 2001–2021 || 07 Mar 2021 || 38 || align=left | Disc.: Cerro TololoAdded on 29 January 2022 || 
|}
back to top

L 

|- id="2001 LD" bgcolor=#FFC2E0
| 2 || 2001 LD || APO || 20.4 || data-sort-value="0.30" | 300 m || multiple || 2001–2017 || 30 Dec 2017 || 99 || align=left | Disc.: LINEARPotentially hazardous object || 
|- id="2001 LO" bgcolor=#FA8072
| 0 || 2001 LO || MCA || 18.34 || data-sort-value="0.64" | 640 m || multiple || 2001–2021 || 30 Aug 2021 || 169 || align=left | Disc.: LONEOS || 
|- id="2001 LU5" bgcolor=#FA8072
| 1 ||  || MCA || 17.9 || data-sort-value="0.78" | 780 m || multiple || 2001–2020 || 09 Dec 2020 || 84 || align=left | Disc.: NEAT || 
|- id="2001 LD6" bgcolor=#FFC2E0
| 0 ||  || AMO || 19.2 || data-sort-value="0.51" | 510 m || multiple || 2001–2010 || 05 May 2010 || 97 || align=left | Disc.: LINEAR || 
|- id="2001 LV16" bgcolor=#fefefe
| 0 ||  || MBA-I || 17.5 || data-sort-value="0.94" | 940 m || multiple || 2001–2020 || 21 Oct 2020 || 107 || align=left | Disc.: LINEARAlt.: 2012 HM82, 2015 BY136 || 
|- id="2001 LY19" bgcolor=#d6d6d6
| 0 ||  || MBA-O || 16.4 || 2.9 km || multiple || 2001–2020 || 11 Dec 2020 || 101 || align=left | Disc.: SDSS || 
|- id="2001 LZ19" bgcolor=#d6d6d6
| 0 ||  || MBA-O || 15.9 || 3.7 km || multiple || 2001–2021 || 21 Jan 2021 || 125 || align=left | Disc.: SDSS || 
|- id="2001 LA20" bgcolor=#E9E9E9
| 0 ||  || MBA-M || 16.5 || 2.1 km || multiple || 2001–2021 || 19 Jan 2021 || 152 || align=left | Disc.: SDSS || 
|- id="2001 LC20" bgcolor=#fefefe
| 0 ||  || MBA-I || 18.15 || data-sort-value="0.70" | 700 m || multiple || 2001–2021 || 16 May 2021 || 100 || align=left | Disc.: SDSS || 
|- id="2001 LD20" bgcolor=#E9E9E9
| 0 ||  || MBA-M || 18.20 || data-sort-value="0.68" | 680 m || multiple || 2001–2021 || 14 Apr 2021 || 66 || align=left | Disc.: Spacewatch || 
|- id="2001 LE20" bgcolor=#d6d6d6
| 0 ||  || MBA-O || 16.29 || 3.1 km || multiple || 2001–2022 || 25 Jan 2022 || 145 || align=left | Disc.: SDSSAlt.: 2010 CM199 || 
|- id="2001 LF20" bgcolor=#E9E9E9
| 0 ||  || MBA-M || 18.33 || data-sort-value="0.64" | 640 m || multiple || 2001–2021 || 07 Feb 2021 || 43 || align=left | Disc.: SDSS || 
|- id="2001 LG20" bgcolor=#fefefe
| 0 ||  || MBA-I || 18.1 || data-sort-value="0.71" | 710 m || multiple || 2001–2020 || 11 Jul 2020 || 42 || align=left | Disc.: SDSS || 
|- id="2001 LH20" bgcolor=#d6d6d6
| 0 ||  || MBA-O || 15.96 || 3.6 km || multiple || 2001–2021 || 15 May 2021 || 161 || align=left | Disc.: Spacewatch || 
|- id="2001 LK20" bgcolor=#d6d6d6
| 0 ||  || MBA-O || 16.6 || 2.7 km || multiple || 2001–2018 || 08 Nov 2018 || 62 || align=left | Disc.: SDSS || 
|- id="2001 LL20" bgcolor=#E9E9E9
| 0 ||  || MBA-M || 16.94 || 1.7 km || multiple || 2001–2022 || 27 Jan 2022 || 100 || align=left | Disc.: SDSS || 
|- id="2001 LM20" bgcolor=#d6d6d6
| 0 ||  || MBA-O || 16.7 || 2.5 km || multiple || 2001–2020 || 13 Sep 2020 || 59 || align=left | Disc.: SDSS || 
|- id="2001 LN20" bgcolor=#E9E9E9
| 0 ||  || MBA-M || 17.0 || 2.2 km || multiple || 2001–2019 || 24 Apr 2019 || 39 || align=left | Disc.: SDSS || 
|- id="2001 LO20" bgcolor=#E9E9E9
| 0 ||  || MBA-M || 17.4 || 1.4 km || multiple || 2001–2019 || 29 Nov 2019 || 43 || align=left | Disc.: Spacewatch || 
|- id="2001 LP20" bgcolor=#d6d6d6
| 0 ||  || MBA-O || 16.8 || 2.4 km || multiple || 2001–2020 || 19 Oct 2020 || 46 || align=left | Disc.: Spacewatch || 
|- id="2001 LQ20" bgcolor=#fefefe
| 0 ||  || HUN || 18.4 || data-sort-value="0.62" | 620 m || multiple || 2001–2020 || 11 Nov 2020 || 38 || align=left | Disc.: SDSS || 
|- id="2001 LR20" bgcolor=#E9E9E9
| 0 ||  || MBA-M || 18.34 || data-sort-value="0.90" | 900 m || multiple || 2001–2019 || 25 Sep 2019 || 164 || align=left | Disc.: Spacewatch || 
|- id="2001 LS20" bgcolor=#d6d6d6
| 1 ||  || MBA-O || 16.8 || 2.4 km || multiple || 2001–2020 || 01 Feb 2020 || 49 || align=left | Disc.: SDSS || 
|- id="2001 LT20" bgcolor=#d6d6d6
| 0 ||  || MBA-O || 16.9 || 2.3 km || multiple || 2001–2019 || 24 Dec 2019 || 36 || align=left | Disc.: SDSS || 
|- id="2001 LU20" bgcolor=#d6d6d6
| 0 ||  || MBA-O || 16.4 || 2.9 km || multiple || 2001–2021 || 15 Jan 2021 || 79 || align=left | Disc.: SDSS || 
|- id="2001 LV20" bgcolor=#E9E9E9
| 0 ||  || MBA-M || 17.4 || 1.4 km || multiple || 2001–2019 || 05 Nov 2019 || 29 || align=left | Disc.: SDSS || 
|}
back to top

M 

|- id="2001 MD1" bgcolor=#FFC2E0
| 5 ||  || AMO || 21.4 || data-sort-value="0.19" | 190 m || single || 68 days || 23 Aug 2001 || 106 || align=left | Disc.: LINEAR || 
|- id="2001 MS3" bgcolor=#FFC2E0
| 5 ||  || APO || 24.0 || data-sort-value="0.056" | 56 m || single || 13 days || 28 Jun 2001 || 23 || align=left | Disc.: NEAT || 
|- id="2001 MA5" bgcolor=#E9E9E9
| 0 ||  || MBA-M || 16.64 || 2.0 km || multiple || 2001–2021 || 14 Apr 2021 || 211 || align=left | Disc.: NEATAlt.: 2014 SW265 || 
|- id="2001 MY7" bgcolor=#FFC2E0
| 0 ||  || AMO || 21.8 || data-sort-value="0.16" | 160 m || multiple || 2001–2021 || 16 Jun 2021 || 83 || align=left | Disc.: LINEAR || 
|- id="2001 MM8" bgcolor=#fefefe
| 1 ||  || MBA-I || 17.5 || data-sort-value="0.94" | 940 m || multiple || 2001–2020 || 01 Jan 2020 || 69 || align=left | Disc.: Siding Spring || 
|- id="2001 MM17" bgcolor=#d6d6d6
| 0 ||  || MBA-O || 16.81 || 2.4 km || multiple || 2000–2021 || 18 Mar 2021 || 58 || align=left | Disc.: SpacewatchAlt.: 2015 BQ343 || 
|- id="2001 MQ21" bgcolor=#E9E9E9
| 0 ||  || MBA-M || 17.20 || 2.0 km || multiple || 2001–2022 || 27 Jan 2022 || 98 || align=left | Disc.: NEAT || 
|- id="2001 MC22" bgcolor=#FA8072
| 0 ||  || MCA || 18.1 || data-sort-value="0.71" | 710 m || multiple || 2001–2019 || 29 Oct 2019 || 173 || align=left | Disc.: NEAT || 
|- id="2001 MM31" bgcolor=#fefefe
| 0 ||  || MBA-I || 17.5 || data-sort-value="0.94" | 940 m || multiple || 2001–2019 || 29 Nov 2019 || 125 || align=left | Disc.: NEATAlt.: 2012 UV144 || 
|- id="2001 MS31" bgcolor=#d6d6d6
| 0 ||  || MBA-O || 16.2 || 3.2 km || multiple || 2001–2021 || 05 Jan 2021 || 81 || align=left | Disc.: SDSS || 
|- id="2001 MT31" bgcolor=#d6d6d6
| 0 ||  || MBA-O || 16.4 || 2.9 km || multiple || 2001–2020 || 17 Oct 2020 || 96 || align=left | Disc.: SDSS || 
|- id="2001 MU31" bgcolor=#d6d6d6
| 0 ||  || MBA-O || 17.00 || 2.2 km || multiple || 2001–2022 || 26 Jan 2022 || 64 || align=left | Disc.: SDSS || 
|- id="2001 MV31" bgcolor=#E9E9E9
| 0 ||  || MBA-M || 16.8 || 1.8 km || multiple || 2001–2019 || 28 Oct 2019 || 47 || align=left | Disc.: NEAT || 
|- id="2001 MX31" bgcolor=#d6d6d6
| 0 ||  || MBA-O || 16.86 || 2.4 km || multiple || 2001–2021 || 07 Jul 2021 || 81 || align=left | Disc.: SpacewatchAlt.: 2010 LZ30 || 
|- id="2001 MY31" bgcolor=#E9E9E9
| 0 ||  || MBA-M || 16.9 || 1.8 km || multiple || 2001–2020 || 09 Dec 2020 || 87 || align=left | Disc.: SDSS || 
|- id="2001 MA32" bgcolor=#d6d6d6
| 0 ||  || MBA-O || 16.1 || 3.4 km || multiple || 2001–2020 || 08 Dec 2020 || 99 || align=left | Disc.: Spacewatch || 
|- id="2001 MB32" bgcolor=#d6d6d6
| 0 ||  || MBA-O || 16.7 || 2.5 km || multiple || 2001–2019 || 28 Oct 2019 || 54 || align=left | Disc.: SDSS || 
|- id="2001 MC32" bgcolor=#fefefe
| 0 ||  || MBA-I || 16.86 || 1.3 km || multiple || 2001–2022 || 06 Jan 2022 || 80 || align=left | Disc.: NEAT || 
|- id="2001 MD32" bgcolor=#d6d6d6
| 1 ||  || HIL || 16.0 || 3.5 km || multiple || 2001–2019 || 03 Jan 2019 || 54 || align=left | Disc.: SpacewatchAlt.: 2010 ON81 || 
|- id="2001 ME32" bgcolor=#fefefe
| 0 ||  || MBA-I || 18.2 || data-sort-value="0.68" | 680 m || multiple || 2001–2021 || 18 Jan 2021 || 44 || align=left | Disc.: Spacewatch || 
|- id="2001 MF32" bgcolor=#E9E9E9
| 0 ||  || MBA-M || 17.8 || data-sort-value="0.82" | 820 m || multiple || 2001–2018 || 07 Aug 2018 || 37 || align=left | Disc.: SDSS || 
|- id="2001 MG32" bgcolor=#E9E9E9
| 0 ||  || MBA-M || 17.60 || 1.7 km || multiple || 2001–2022 || 24 Jan 2022 || 66 || align=left | Disc.: Spacewatch || 
|- id="2001 MH32" bgcolor=#E9E9E9
| 1 ||  || MBA-M || 18.32 || 1.2 km || multiple || 2001–2019 || 06 Jul 2019 || 41 || align=left | Disc.: Spacewatch || 
|- id="2001 MJ32" bgcolor=#E9E9E9
| 0 ||  || MBA-M || 18.03 || 1.0 km || multiple || 2001–2019 || 20 Sep 2019 || 52 || align=left | Disc.: Spacewatch || 
|}
back to top

N 

|- id="2001 ND1" bgcolor=#E9E9E9
| 0 ||  || MBA-M || 17.63 || data-sort-value="0.89" | 890 m || multiple || 2001–2021 || 11 May 2021 || 79 || align=left | Disc.: NEAT || 
|- id="2001 NW1" bgcolor=#E9E9E9
| 0 ||  || MBA-M || 16.89 || 1.2 km || multiple || 2001–2021 || 19 May 2021 || 99 || align=left | Disc.: NEAT || 
|- id="2001 NY1" bgcolor=#FFC2E0
| 6 ||  || AMO || 23.2 || data-sort-value="0.081" | 81 m || single || 71 days || 19 Sep 2001 || 24 || align=left | Disc.: NEAT || 
|- id="2001 NA2" bgcolor=#FA8072
| 1 ||  || MCA || 17.0 || 2.2 km || multiple || 2001–2017 || 13 Nov 2017 || 107 || align=left | Disc.: NEAT || 
|- id="2001 NJ2" bgcolor=#fefefe
| 0 ||  || MBA-I || 18.48 || data-sort-value="0.60" | 600 m || multiple || 2001–2021 || 26 Nov 2021 || 142 || align=left | Disc.: NEATAlt.: 2014 JU5 || 
|- id="2001 NM2" bgcolor=#E9E9E9
| 0 ||  || MBA-M || 17.86 || data-sort-value="0.80" | 800 m || multiple || 2001–2021 || 08 May 2021 || 87 || align=left | Disc.: NEAT || 
|- id="2001 NJ6" bgcolor=#FFC2E0
| 1 ||  || AMO || 20.7 || data-sort-value="0.26" | 260 m || multiple || 2001–2017 || 26 Sep 2017 || 80 || align=left | Disc.: NEAT || 
|- id="2001 ND13" bgcolor=#FFC2E0
| 6 ||  || APO || 21.5 || data-sort-value="0.18" | 180 m || single || 19 days || 01 Aug 2001 || 25 || align=left | Disc.: NEAT || 
|- id="2001 NE13" bgcolor=#FFC2E0
| 1 ||  || AMO || 20.1 || data-sort-value="0.34" | 340 m || multiple || 1998–2007 || 14 Mar 2007 || 47 || align=left | Disc.: NEAT || 
|- id="2001 NH13" bgcolor=#E9E9E9
| 0 ||  || MBA-M || 17.0 || 1.7 km || multiple || 2001–2020 || 27 Jan 2020 || 287 || align=left | Disc.: NEATAlt.: 2014 QK281 || 
|- id="2001 NN13" bgcolor=#E9E9E9
| 1 ||  || MBA-M || 17.3 || 1.5 km || multiple || 2001–2018 || 12 Aug 2018 || 63 || align=left | Disc.: NEAT || 
|- id="2001 NW13" bgcolor=#E9E9E9
| 0 ||  || MBA-M || 17.5 || data-sort-value="0.94" | 940 m || multiple || 2001–2020 || 02 Feb 2020 || 38 || align=left | Disc.: NEATAdded on 21 August 2021 || 
|- id="2001 NG16" bgcolor=#E9E9E9
| 0 ||  || MBA-M || 16.9 || 1.8 km || multiple || 2001–2021 || 18 Jan 2021 || 151 || align=left | Disc.: NEATAlt.: 2001 NL22, 2010 RC22, 2015 XW152 || 
|- id="2001 NZ16" bgcolor=#fefefe
| 0 ||  || MBA-I || 18.2 || data-sort-value="0.68" | 680 m || multiple || 2001–2021 || 15 May 2021 || 42 || align=left | Disc.: NEATAdded on 21 August 2021 || 
|- id="2001 NB19" bgcolor=#fefefe
| 0 ||  || MBA-I || 17.6 || data-sort-value="0.90" | 900 m || multiple || 2001–2019 || 26 Nov 2019 || 159 || align=left | Disc.: NEATAlt.: 2015 KH25 || 
|- id="2001 NE23" bgcolor=#fefefe
| 0 ||  || MBA-I || 17.52 || data-sort-value="0.93" | 930 m || multiple || 2001–2021 || 30 Nov 2021 || 159 || align=left | Disc.: NEAT || 
|- id="2001 NG23" bgcolor=#d6d6d6
| 0 ||  || MBA-O || 16.0 || 3.5 km || multiple || 2001–2021 || 21 Jan 2021 || 116 || align=left | Disc.: NEAT || 
|- id="2001 NH23" bgcolor=#fefefe
| 0 ||  || MBA-I || 18.5 || data-sort-value="0.59" | 590 m || multiple || 2001–2018 || 11 Jul 2018 || 33 || align=left | Disc.: NEAT || 
|- id="2001 NJ23" bgcolor=#d6d6d6
| 0 ||  || MBA-O || 16.3 || 3.1 km || multiple || 2001–2020 || 02 Jan 2020 || 26 || align=left | Disc.: NEATAdded on 19 October 2020 || 
|}
back to top

O 

|- id="2001 OT" bgcolor=#FFC2E0
| 2 || 2001 OT || ATE || 21.7 || data-sort-value="0.16" | 160 m || multiple || 2001–2019 || 27 Aug 2019 || 104 || align=left | Disc.: AMOS || 
|- id="2001 OU" bgcolor=#fefefe
| 0 || 2001 OU || MBA-I || 17.9 || data-sort-value="0.78" | 780 m || multiple || 2001–2021 || 07 Jun 2021 || 135 || align=left | Disc.: NEATAlt.: 2015 UN48 || 
|- id="2001 OD3" bgcolor=#FFC2E0
| 0 ||  || AMO || 19.46 || data-sort-value="0.46" | 460 m || multiple || 2001–2018 || 09 Nov 2018 || 69 || align=left | Disc.: AMOS || 
|- id="2001 OE3" bgcolor=#FFC2E0
| 1 ||  || AMO || 20.3 || data-sort-value="0.31" | 310 m || multiple || 2001–2003 || 18 Jul 2003 || 223 || align=left | Disc.: NEAT || 
|- id="2001 OZ3" bgcolor=#E9E9E9
| 0 ||  || MBA-M || 17.82 || data-sort-value="0.81" | 810 m || multiple || 2001–2021 || 12 Jun 2021 || 110 || align=left | Disc.: NEAT || 
|- id="2001 OC4" bgcolor=#fefefe
| 0 ||  || MBA-I || 17.5 || data-sort-value="0.94" | 940 m || multiple || 2001–2019 || 02 Nov 2019 || 126 || align=left | Disc.: NEATAlt.: 2012 TM59 || 
|- id="2001 OA10" bgcolor=#E9E9E9
| 0 ||  || MBA-M || 16.8 || 1.8 km || multiple || 2001–2021 || 18 Jan 2021 || 130 || align=left | Disc.: NEATAlt.: 2010 QL1 || 
|- id="2001 OX12" bgcolor=#d6d6d6
| 0 ||  || MBA-O || 16.14 || 3.3 km || multiple || 2001–2022 || 09 Jan 2022 || 121 || align=left | Disc.: Farpoint Obs. || 
|- id="2001 OD13" bgcolor=#FA8072
| 1 ||  || MCA || 19.3 || data-sort-value="0.41" | 410 m || multiple || 2001–2020 || 11 Nov 2020 || 89 || align=left | Disc.: NEAT || 
|- id="2001 OE13" bgcolor=#FA8072
| 2 ||  || MCA || 19.5 || data-sort-value="0.37" | 370 m || multiple || 2001–2014 || 23 Aug 2014 || 26 || align=left | Disc.: NEAT || 
|- id="2001 OV13" bgcolor=#FFC2E0
| 0 ||  || AMO || 23.1 || data-sort-value="0.085" | 85 m || multiple || 2001–2015 || 17 Sep 2015 || 58 || align=left | Disc.: LONEOSAlt.: 2015 NH13 || 
|- id="2001 OX13" bgcolor=#FFC2E0
| 1 ||  || AMO || 19.0 || data-sort-value="0.56" | 560 m || multiple || 2001–2012 || 01 Oct 2012 || 80 || align=left | Disc.: NEAT || 
|- id="2001 OO16" bgcolor=#d6d6d6
| 1 ||  || MBA-O || 17.83 || 1.5 km || multiple || 2001–2017 || 22 Oct 2017 || 55 || align=left | Disc.: NEAT || 
|- id="2001 OB17" bgcolor=#E9E9E9
| 0 ||  || MBA-M || 17.16 || 1.1 km || multiple || 2001–2021 || 03 Aug 2021 || 136 || align=left | Disc.: Ondřejov Obs. || 
|- id="2001 OF17" bgcolor=#fefefe
| 0 ||  || MBA-I || 18.3 || data-sort-value="0.65" | 650 m || multiple || 2001–2020 || 23 Sep 2020 || 70 || align=left | Disc.: Ondřejov Obs.Added on 17 June 2021Alt.: 2012 LV31 || 
|- id="2001 OK17" bgcolor=#FFE699
| – ||  || Asteroid || 18.8 || data-sort-value="0.97" | 970 m || single || 23 days || 09 Aug 2001 || 53 || align=left | Disc.: AMOSMCA at MPC || 
|- id="2001 OF25" bgcolor=#FFC2E0
| 7 ||  || AMO || 21.4 || data-sort-value="0.19" | 190 m || single || 58 days || 18 Sep 2001 || 32 || align=left | Disc.: LONEOS || 
|- id="2001 OP26" bgcolor=#E9E9E9
| 0 ||  || MBA-M || 16.98 || 1.2 km || multiple || 2001–2021 || 12 Jun 2021 || 220 || align=left | Disc.: NEATAlt.: 2001 NB23 || 
|- id="2001 OD27" bgcolor=#E9E9E9
| 0 ||  || MBA-M || 17.8 || 1.2 km || multiple || 2001–2018 || 11 Jul 2018 || 41 || align=left | Disc.: NEATAdded on 21 August 2021Alt.: 2009 HA85 || 
|- id="2001 OM28" bgcolor=#E9E9E9
| 0 ||  || MBA-M || 16.6 || 2.0 km || multiple || 2001–2021 || 24 Jan 2021 || 113 || align=left | Disc.: NEATAlt.: 2011 YW66 || 
|- id="2001 OG29" bgcolor=#E9E9E9
| 1 ||  || MBA-M || 17.8 || 1.2 km || multiple || 1997–2018 || 14 Jul 2018 || 76 || align=left | Disc.: NEATAlt.: 2010 VJ185 || 
|- id="2001 OO29" bgcolor=#FA8072
| 0 ||  || MCA || 17.6 || data-sort-value="0.90" | 900 m || multiple || 2001–2020 || 19 Jan 2020 || 126 || align=left | Disc.: NEAT || 
|- id="2001 OE31" bgcolor=#fefefe
| 0 ||  || MBA-I || 17.9 || data-sort-value="0.78" | 780 m || multiple || 2001–2020 || 25 May 2020 || 100 || align=left | Disc.: NEATAlt.: 2011 TH9 || 
|- id="2001 OK31" bgcolor=#E9E9E9
| 0 ||  || MBA-M || 17.81 || data-sort-value="0.81" | 810 m || multiple || 2001–2021 || 01 May 2021 || 56 || align=left | Disc.: NEAT || 
|- id="2001 OH32" bgcolor=#FA8072
| – ||  || MCA || 18.5 || data-sort-value="0.59" | 590 m || single || 16 days || 09 Aug 2001 || 14 || align=left | Disc.: Mount John || 
|- id="2001 OJ34" bgcolor=#fefefe
| 0 ||  || MBA-I || 18.04 || data-sort-value="0.73" | 730 m || multiple || 2001–2020 || 11 Oct 2020 || 67 || align=left | Disc.: NEATAlt.: 2005 SJ210 || 
|- id="2001 OC36" bgcolor=#FFC2E0
| 8 ||  || APO || 22.9 || data-sort-value="0.093" | 93 m || single || 7 days || 01 Aug 2001 || 24 || align=left | Disc.: AMOS || 
|- id="2001 OE36" bgcolor=#E9E9E9
| 1 ||  || MBA-M || 17.7 || data-sort-value="0.86" | 860 m || multiple || 2001–2021 || 05 Jun 2021 || 204 || align=left | Disc.: NEAT || 
|- id="2001 OU36" bgcolor=#d6d6d6
| 0 ||  || MBA-O || 15.65 || 4.1 km || multiple || 2001–2021 || 09 May 2021 || 236 || align=left | Disc.: NEAT || 
|- id="2001 OC38" bgcolor=#E9E9E9
| 0 ||  || MBA-M || 17.56 || data-sort-value="0.91" | 910 m || multiple || 2001–2021 || 17 May 2021 || 119 || align=left | Disc.: NEAT || 
|- id="2001 OV38" bgcolor=#d6d6d6
| 0 ||  || MBA-O || 16.14 || 3.3 km || multiple || 2001–2021 || 02 Apr 2021 || 108 || align=left | Disc.: NEATAlt.: 2010 JP16 || 
|- id="2001 OD40" bgcolor=#d6d6d6
| 0 ||  || MBA-O || 16.07 || 3.4 km || multiple || 2001–2021 || 02 Apr 2021 || 126 || align=left | Disc.: NEATAlt.: 2010 KT116 || 
|- id="2001 OO40" bgcolor=#E9E9E9
| 0 ||  || MBA-M || 16.89 || 1.8 km || multiple || 2001–2021 || 15 Apr 2021 || 244 || align=left | Disc.: NEAT || 
|- id="2001 OO41" bgcolor=#E9E9E9
| 0 ||  || MBA-M || 16.2 || 1.7 km || multiple || 1989–2021 || 11 Jun 2021 || 357 || align=left | Disc.: NEATAlt.: 2014 XV15 || 
|- id="2001 OQ44" bgcolor=#E9E9E9
| 0 ||  || MBA-M || 16.64 || 2.0 km || multiple || 2001–2021 || 03 May 2021 || 209 || align=left | Disc.: NEAT || 
|- id="2001 OV44" bgcolor=#FA8072
| 1 ||  || MCA || 17.3 || 1.5 km || multiple || 2001–2020 || 26 Jan 2020 || 161 || align=left | Disc.: LONEOS || 
|- id="2001 OW44" bgcolor=#FA8072
| 1 ||  || MCA || 18.9 || data-sort-value="0.49" | 490 m || multiple || 2001–2020 || 07 Dec 2020 || 238 || align=left | Disc.: LONEOS || 
|- id="2001 OO55" bgcolor=#E9E9E9
| 2 ||  || MBA-M || 17.3 || 1.5 km || multiple || 2001–2019 || 18 Nov 2019 || 52 || align=left | Disc.: NEAT || 
|- id="2001 OE59" bgcolor=#E9E9E9
| 0 ||  || MBA-M || 16.4 || 2.0 km || multiple || 2001–2021 || 18 Jan 2021 || 172 || align=left | Disc.: AMOSAlt.: 2008 AU127, 2010 KJ108 || 
|- id="2001 OK59" bgcolor=#FA8072
| 0 ||  || MCA || 17.4 || 1.6 km || multiple || 2001–2020 || 25 Jan 2020 || 291 || align=left | Disc.: AMOS || 
|- id="2001 OR59" bgcolor=#E9E9E9
| 0 ||  || MBA-M || 16.5 || 2.8 km || multiple || 2001–2019 || 02 Nov 2019 || 203 || align=left | Disc.: AMOSAlt.: 2010 NA6 || 
|- id="2001 OY64" bgcolor=#fefefe
| 0 ||  || MBA-I || 18.4 || data-sort-value="0.62" | 620 m || multiple || 2001–2019 || 05 Nov 2019 || 52 || align=left | Disc.: NEAT || 
|- id="2001 OH66" bgcolor=#E9E9E9
| 1 ||  || MBA-M || 16.7 || 1.9 km || multiple || 2001–2019 || 06 Dec 2019 || 50 || align=left | Disc.: NEAT || 
|- id="2001 OK69" bgcolor=#E9E9E9
| 0 ||  || MBA-M || 16.39 || 1.6 km || multiple || 2001–2021 || 20 Apr 2021 || 222 || align=left | Disc.: NEATAlt.: 2012 CS32 || 
|- id="2001 OB74" bgcolor=#FA8072
| 1 ||  || MCA || 17.5 || 1.8 km || multiple || 2001–2017 || 16 Nov 2017 || 128 || align=left | Disc.: NEAT || 
|- id="2001 OC74" bgcolor=#FA8072
| 0 ||  || MCA || 19.39 || data-sort-value="0.39" | 390 m || multiple || 2001–2021 || 03 May 2021 || 53 || align=left | Disc.: NEAT || 
|- id="2001 OK78" bgcolor=#fefefe
| 0 ||  || MBA-I || 18.07 || data-sort-value="0.72" | 720 m || multiple || 2001–2021 || 07 Apr 2021 || 139 || align=left | Disc.: NEATAlt.: 2014 DE140 || 
|- id="2001 OQ78" bgcolor=#E9E9E9
| 0 ||  || MBA-M || 16.92 || 2.3 km || multiple || 2001–2022 || 23 Jan 2022 || 242 || align=left | Disc.: NEATAlt.: 2015 OP52 || 
|- id="2001 OZ82" bgcolor=#E9E9E9
| 0 ||  || MBA-M || 16.39 || 1.6 km || multiple || 1980–2021 || 19 May 2021 || 287 || align=left | Disc.: NEATAlt.: 2013 KD18 || 
|- id="2001 OY90" bgcolor=#E9E9E9
| 0 ||  || MBA-M || 16.99 || 1.2 km || multiple || 2001–2021 || 07 Jul 2021 || 232 || align=left | Disc.: AMOSAlt.: 2012 CJ70, 2014 UU173 || 
|- id="2001 OD91" bgcolor=#E9E9E9
| 0 ||  || MBA-M || 17.4 || 1.8 km || multiple || 2001–2020 || 21 Dec 2020 || 180 || align=left | Disc.: AMOSAlt.: 2015 NO24 || 
|- id="2001 OM91" bgcolor=#d6d6d6
| 0 ||  || MBA-O || 16.12 || 3.3 km || multiple || 2001–2021 || 01 Apr 2021 || 137 || align=left | Disc.: NEAT || 
|- id="2001 OT91" bgcolor=#d6d6d6
| 0 ||  || MBA-O || 16.40 || 2.9 km || multiple || 2001–2022 || 10 Jan 2022 || 124 || align=left | Disc.: NEATAlt.: 2013 YK1 || 
|- id="2001 OQ95" bgcolor=#fefefe
| 0 ||  || HUN || 18.16 || data-sort-value="0.69" | 690 m || multiple || 2001–2021 || 18 Apr 2021 || 192 || align=left | Disc.: NEATAlt.: 2011 HE2 || 
|- id="2001 OJ108" bgcolor=#C2E0FF
| E ||  || TNO || 7.8 || 95 km || single || 1 day || 25 Jul 2001 || 4 || align=left | Disc.: Mauna Kea Obs.LoUTNOs, cubewano? || 
|- id="2001 OK108" bgcolor=#C2E0FF
| 4 ||  || TNO || 7.45 || 108 km || multiple || 1999–2021 || 12 Sep 2021 || 22 || align=left | Disc.: Mauna Kea Obs.LoUTNOs, cubewano (cold) || 
|- id="2001 OL108" bgcolor=#C2E0FF
| E ||  || TNO || 8.4 || 72 km || single || 114 days || 15 Nov 2001 || 6 || align=left | Disc.: Mauna Kea Obs.LoUTNOs, cubewano? || 
|- id="2001 OM108" bgcolor=#C2E0FF
| E ||  || TNO || 8.0 || 86 km || single || 112 days || 14 Nov 2001 || 6 || align=left | Disc.: Mauna Kea Obs.LoUTNOs, cubewano? || 
|- id="2001 ON108" bgcolor=#C2E0FF
| E ||  || TNO || 7.6 || 104 km || single || 56 days || 19 Sep 2001 || 6 || align=left | Disc.: Mauna Kea Obs.LoUTNOs, cubewano? || 
|- id="2001 OO108" bgcolor=#C2E0FF
| 6 ||  || TNO || 7.9 || 99 km || multiple || 2001–2015 || 28 May 2015 || 9 || align=left | Disc.: Mauna Kea Obs.LoUTNOs, SDO || 
|- id="2001 OP108" bgcolor=#fefefe
| 0 ||  || HUN || 18.11 || data-sort-value="0.71" | 710 m || multiple || 2001–2022 || 10 Jan 2022 || 64 || align=left | Disc.: Mauna Kea Obs.Alt.: 2002 XZ119 || 
|- id="2001 OQ108" bgcolor=#C2E0FF
| 3 ||  || TNO || 6.5 || 167 km || multiple || 2001–2017 || 26 May 2017 || 26 || align=left | Disc.: Cerro TololoLoUTNOs, cubewano (cold)Alt.: 2001 KR76 || 
|- id="2001 OR108" bgcolor=#C2E0FF
| E ||  || TNO || 7.9 || 90 km || single || 1 day || 25 Jul 2001 || 4 || align=left | Disc.: Mauna Kea Obs.LoUTNOs, cubewano? || 
|- id="2001 OS108" bgcolor=#C2E0FF
| E ||  || TNO || 6.8 || 150 km || single || 17 days || 11 Aug 2001 || 5 || align=left | Disc.: Mauna Kea Obs.LoUTNOs, cubewano? || 
|- id="2001 OT108" bgcolor=#C2E0FF
| E ||  || TNO || 9.2 || 55 km || single || 1 day || 26 Jul 2001 || 4 || align=left | Disc.: Mauna Kea Obs.LoUTNOs, SDO || 
|- id="2001 OU108" bgcolor=#C2E0FF
| E ||  || TNO || 6.5 || 209 km || single || 16 days || 11 Aug 2001 || 6 || align=left | Disc.: Mauna Kea Obs.LoUTNOs, other TNO || 
|- id="2001 OX108" bgcolor=#fefefe
| 0 ||  || MBA-I || 18.52 || data-sort-value="0.59" | 590 m || multiple || 2001–2021 || 03 Aug 2021 || 115 || align=left | Disc.: Mauna Kea Obs. || 
|- id="2001 OY108" bgcolor=#C2E0FF
| E ||  || TNO || 7.4 || 114 km || single || 1 day || 25 Jul 2001 || 3 || align=left | Disc.: Mauna Kea Obs.LoUTNOs, cubewano? || 
|- id="2001 OZ108" bgcolor=#C2E0FF
| 3 ||  || TNO || 8.3 || 73 km || multiple || 1999–2006 || 29 Jul 2006 || 18 || align=left | Disc.: Mauna Kea Obs.LoUTNOs, cubewano (cold) || 
|- id="2001 OA109" bgcolor=#d6d6d6
| 0 ||  || MBA-O || 16.2 || 3.2 km || multiple || 2001–2019 || 19 Dec 2019 || 42 || align=left | Disc.: Mauna Kea Obs.Added on 22 July 2020Alt.: 2017 FQ172 || 
|- id="2001 OG109" bgcolor=#C2E0FF
| 3 ||  || TNO || 8.1 || 80 km || multiple || 1999–2014 || 03 Sep 2014 || 20 || align=left | Disc.: Mauna Kea Obs.LoUTNOs, cubewano (cold) || 
|- id="2001 OM109" bgcolor=#C2E0FF
| 3 ||  || TNO || 7.9 || 99 km || multiple || 2001–2006 || 08 Jun 2006 || 20 || align=left | Disc.: Mauna Kea Obs.LoUTNOs, SDO || 
|- id="2001 OE112" bgcolor=#E9E9E9
| 3 ||  || MBA-M || 18.0 || 1.4 km || multiple || 2001–2015 || 20 Nov 2015 || 15 || align=left | Disc.: La Palma Obs. || 
|- id="2001 OG114" bgcolor=#E9E9E9
| 0 ||  || MBA-M || 16.93 || 1.7 km || multiple || 2001–2021 || 07 Apr 2021 || 88 || align=left | Disc.: Spacewatch || 
|- id="2001 OH114" bgcolor=#fefefe
| 0 ||  || MBA-I || 17.7 || data-sort-value="0.86" | 860 m || multiple || 2001–2019 || 22 Oct 2019 || 130 || align=left | Disc.: AMOS || 
|- id="2001 OJ114" bgcolor=#d6d6d6
| 0 ||  || MBA-O || 16.5 || 2.8 km || multiple || 2001–2020 || 24 Dec 2020 || 79 || align=left | Disc.: Spacewatch || 
|- id="2001 OK114" bgcolor=#E9E9E9
| 0 ||  || MBA-M || 17.0 || 1.7 km || multiple || 2001–2020 || 27 Jan 2020 || 124 || align=left | Disc.: NEAT || 
|- id="2001 OL114" bgcolor=#fefefe
| 0 ||  || MBA-I || 18.3 || data-sort-value="0.65" | 650 m || multiple || 1997–2020 || 16 Oct 2020 || 61 || align=left | Disc.: NEAT || 
|- id="2001 OM114" bgcolor=#E9E9E9
| 0 ||  || MBA-M || 16.5 || 2.1 km || multiple || 2001–2021 || 07 Apr 2021 || 132 || align=left | Disc.: NEATAlt.: 2010 OJ122 || 
|- id="2001 ON114" bgcolor=#fefefe
| 0 ||  || MBA-I || 18.15 || data-sort-value="0.70" | 700 m || multiple || 2001–2021 || 10 May 2021 || 80 || align=left | Disc.: NEAT || 
|- id="2001 OO114" bgcolor=#d6d6d6
| 0 ||  || MBA-O || 17.0 || 2.2 km || multiple || 2001–2020 || 23 Apr 2020 || 59 || align=left | Disc.: Spacewatch || 
|- id="2001 OP114" bgcolor=#d6d6d6
| 0 ||  || MBA-O || 16.75 || 2.5 km || multiple || 2001–2021 || 03 Dec 2021 || 152 || align=left | Disc.: NEATAlt.: 2010 LD78 || 
|- id="2001 OQ114" bgcolor=#fefefe
| 0 ||  || MBA-I || 18.0 || data-sort-value="0.75" | 750 m || multiple || 2001–2020 || 05 Nov 2020 || 105 || align=left | Disc.: NEAT || 
|- id="2001 OS114" bgcolor=#E9E9E9
| 1 ||  || MBA-M || 17.8 || 1.2 km || multiple || 2001–2014 || 13 Oct 2014 || 46 || align=left | Disc.: NEATAlt.: 2010 NY139 || 
|- id="2001 OV114" bgcolor=#E9E9E9
| 0 ||  || MBA-M || 17.71 || data-sort-value="0.85" | 850 m || multiple || 1997–2021 || 11 May 2021 || 62 || align=left | Disc.: LONEOS || 
|- id="2001 OW114" bgcolor=#fefefe
| 1 ||  || MBA-I || 18.0 || data-sort-value="0.75" | 750 m || multiple || 2001–2019 || 27 Oct 2019 || 48 || align=left | Disc.: NEAT || 
|- id="2001 OX114" bgcolor=#fefefe
| 0 ||  || MBA-I || 18.0 || data-sort-value="0.75" | 750 m || multiple || 2001–2019 || 22 Sep 2019 || 39 || align=left | Disc.: NEAT || 
|- id="2001 OY114" bgcolor=#fefefe
| 1 ||  || MBA-I || 18.5 || data-sort-value="0.59" | 590 m || multiple || 2001–2018 || 20 May 2018 || 33 || align=left | Disc.: NEAT || 
|- id="2001 OZ114" bgcolor=#fefefe
| 0 ||  || MBA-I || 17.7 || data-sort-value="0.86" | 860 m || multiple || 2001–2021 || 04 Jan 2021 || 62 || align=left | Disc.: NEAT || 
|- id="2001 OA115" bgcolor=#fefefe
| 0 ||  || MBA-I || 18.5 || data-sort-value="0.59" | 590 m || multiple || 2001–2020 || 23 Nov 2020 || 51 || align=left | Disc.: NEAT || 
|- id="2001 OC115" bgcolor=#E9E9E9
| 0 ||  || MBA-M || 17.6 || 1.7 km || multiple || 2001–2019 || 23 Aug 2019 || 39 || align=left | Disc.: Siding Spring || 
|- id="2001 OD115" bgcolor=#E9E9E9
| 0 ||  || MBA-M || 17.8 || 1.5 km || multiple || 2001–2019 || 27 Oct 2019 || 52 || align=left | Disc.: NEAT || 
|- id="2001 OE115" bgcolor=#E9E9E9
| 1 ||  || MBA-M || 17.8 || data-sort-value="0.82" | 820 m || multiple || 2001–2019 || 04 Feb 2019 || 21 || align=left | Disc.: NEAT || 
|- id="2001 OF115" bgcolor=#d6d6d6
| 0 ||  || MBA-O || 15.3 || 4.8 km || multiple || 2001–2020 || 22 Dec 2020 || 70 || align=left | Disc.: NEAT || 
|- id="2001 OH115" bgcolor=#fefefe
| 1 ||  || MBA-I || 17.7 || data-sort-value="0.86" | 860 m || multiple || 2001–2016 || 18 Dec 2016 || 34 || align=left | Disc.: NEAT || 
|- id="2001 OJ115" bgcolor=#fefefe
| 0 ||  || MBA-I || 17.8 || data-sort-value="0.82" | 820 m || multiple || 2001–2020 || 16 Nov 2020 || 38 || align=left | Disc.: NEAT || 
|- id="2001 OK115" bgcolor=#E9E9E9
| 0 ||  || MBA-M || 17.58 || 1.7 km || multiple || 2001–2022 || 27 Jan 2022 || 53 || align=left | Disc.: NEAT || 
|- id="2001 OL115" bgcolor=#E9E9E9
| 0 ||  || MBA-M || 17.55 || data-sort-value="0.92" | 920 m || multiple || 2001–2021 || 28 Jul 2021 || 72 || align=left | Disc.: NEAT || 
|- id="2001 OM115" bgcolor=#d6d6d6
| 0 ||  || MBA-O || 16.2 || 3.2 km || multiple || 2001–2020 || 02 Feb 2020 || 58 || align=left | Disc.: NEATAdded on 22 July 2020 || 
|- id="2001 ON115" bgcolor=#d6d6d6
| 0 ||  || MBA-O || 17.0 || 2.2 km || multiple || 2001–2020 || 02 Oct 2020 || 72 || align=left | Disc.: NEATAdded on 13 September 2020Alt.: 2010 PF56 || 
|}
back to top

References 
 

Lists of unnumbered minor planets